= Mombasa =

City in Mombasa County, Kenya

- City and city county
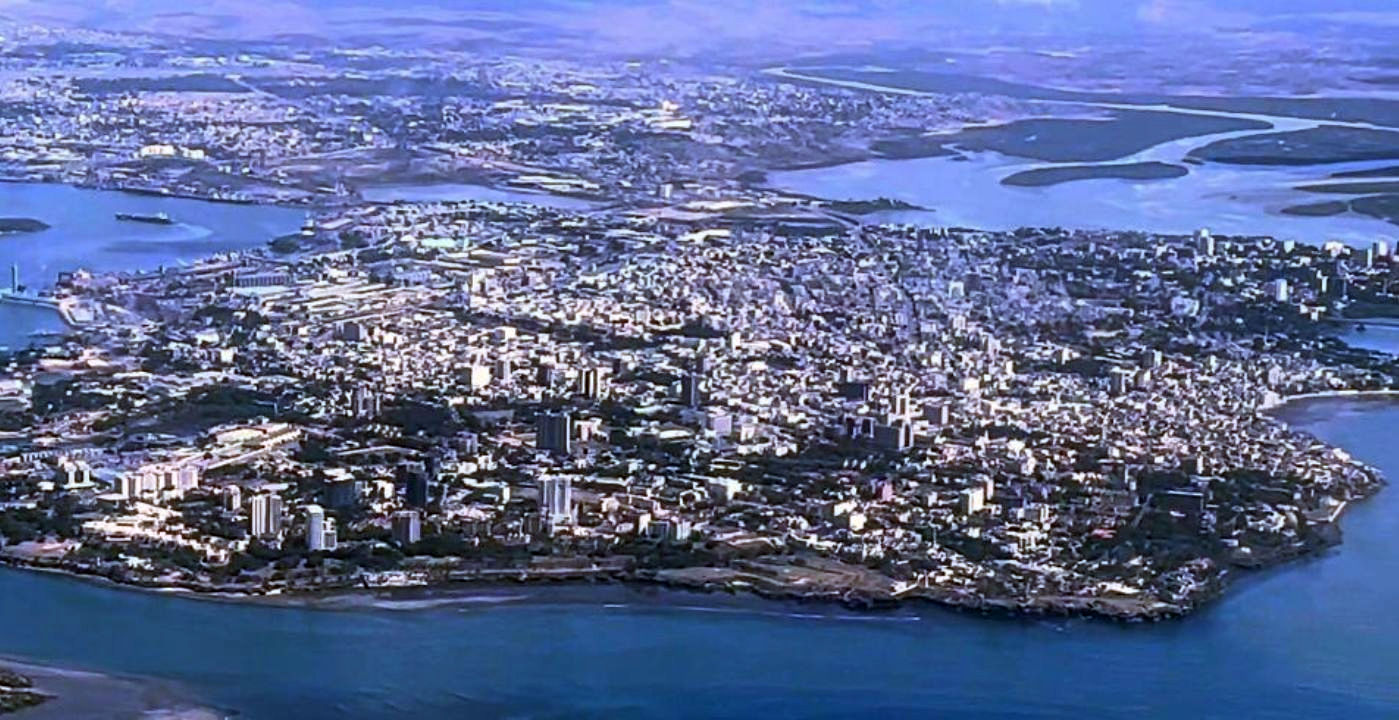
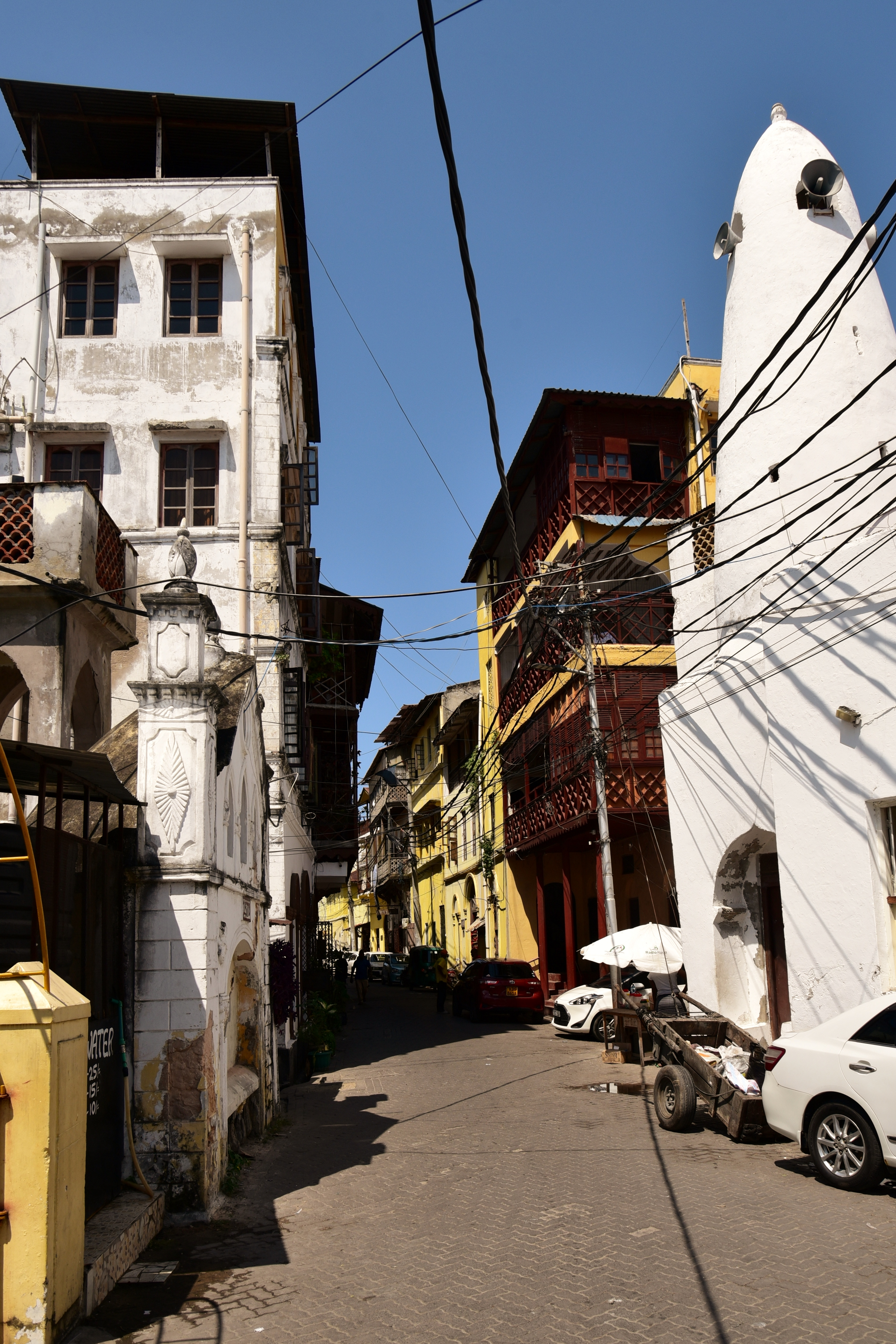
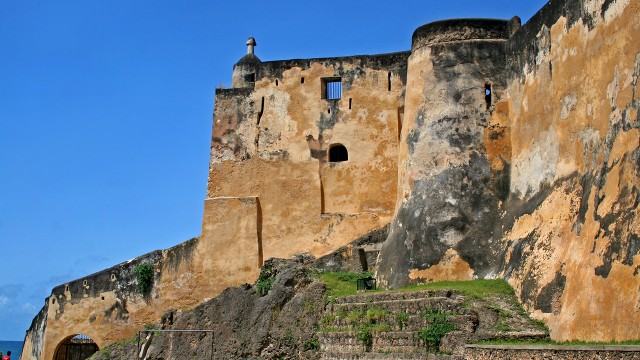
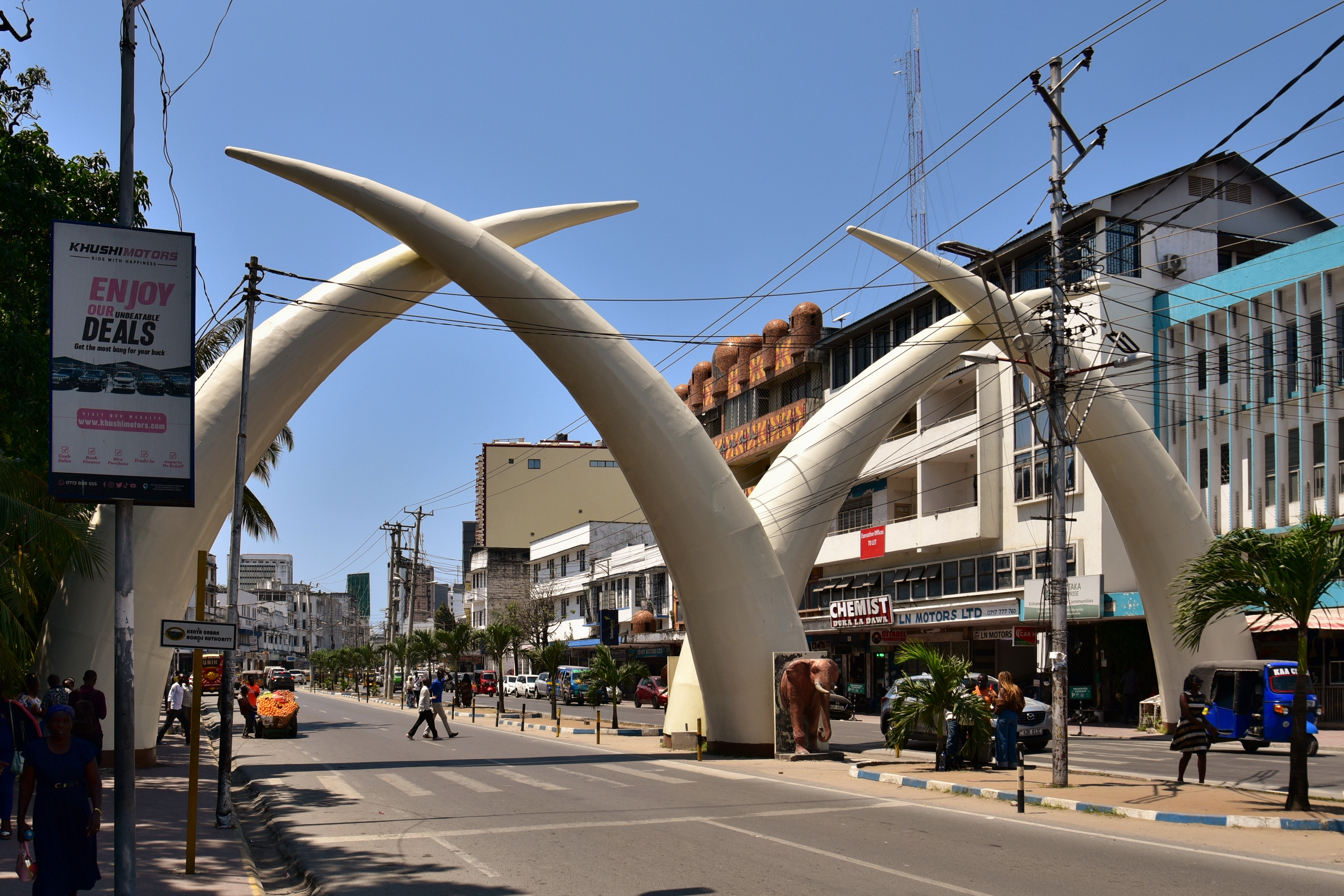
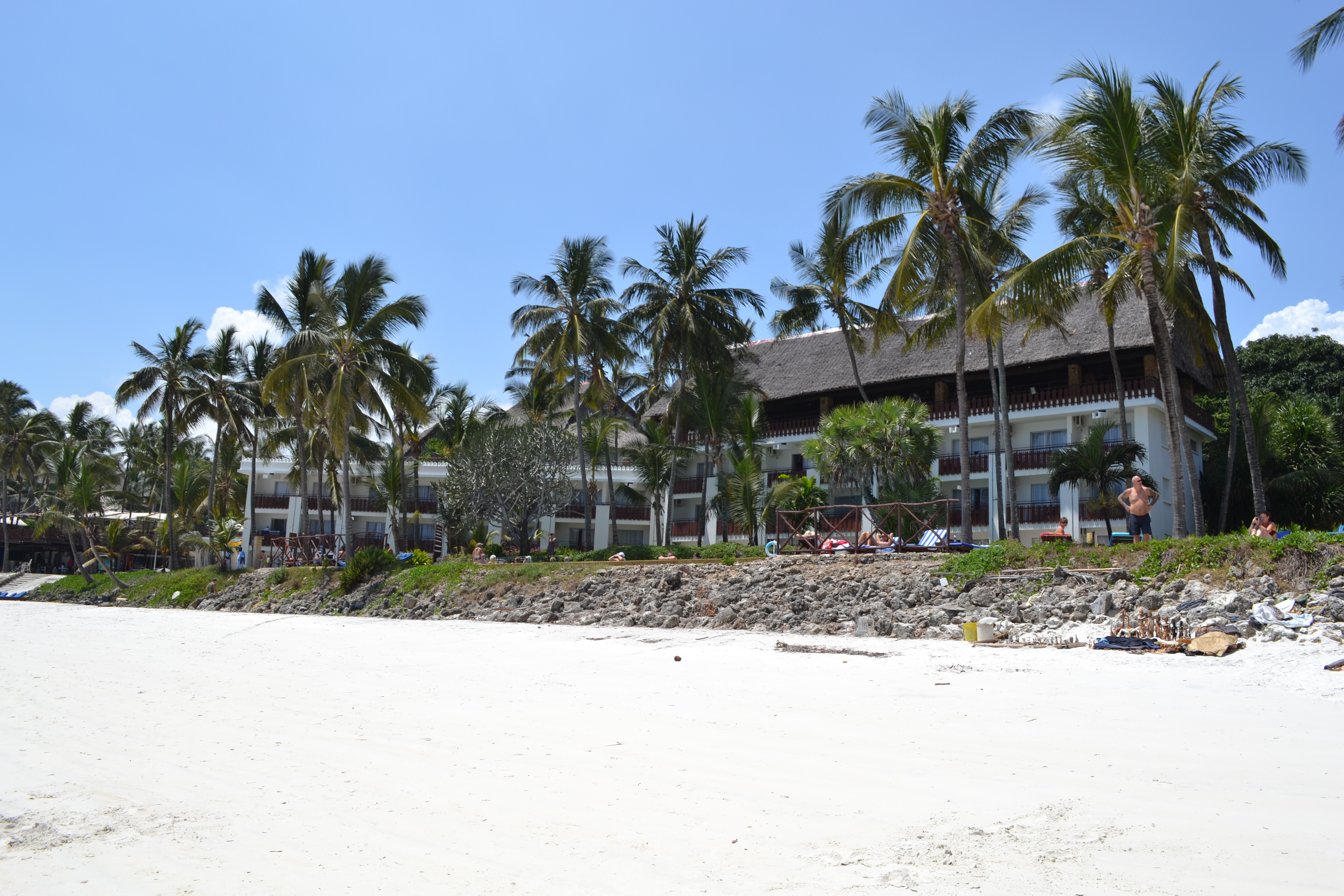
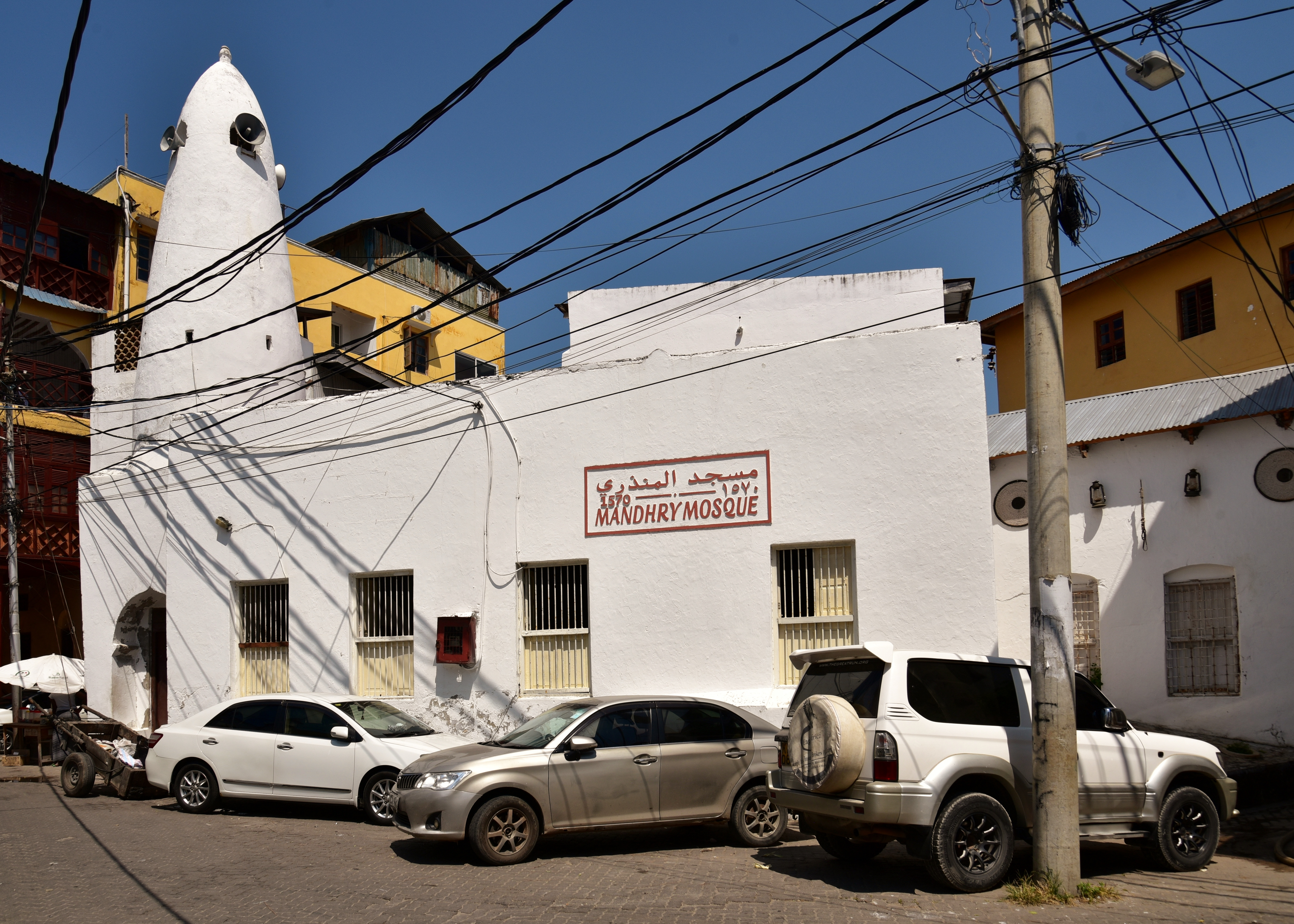
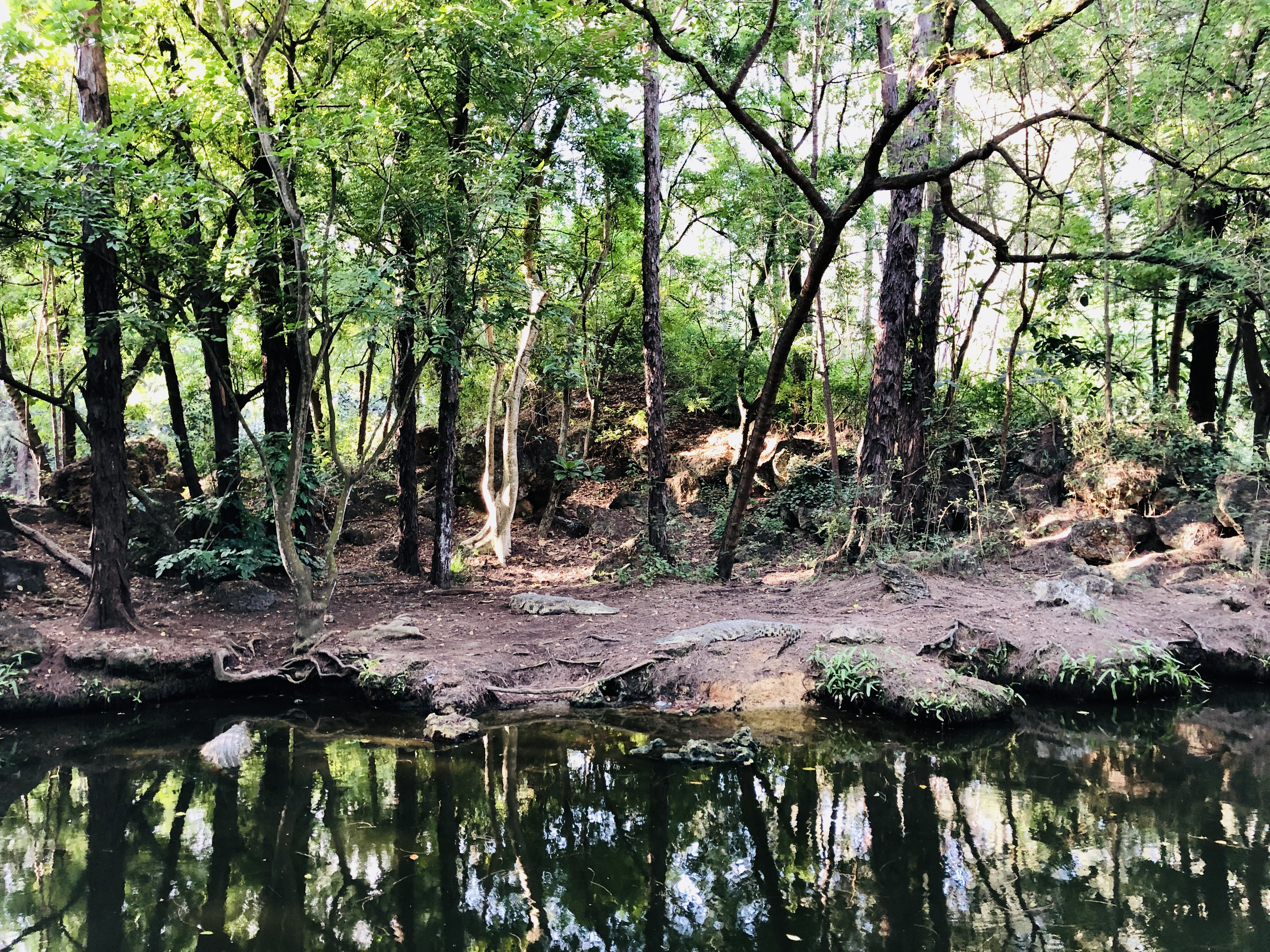
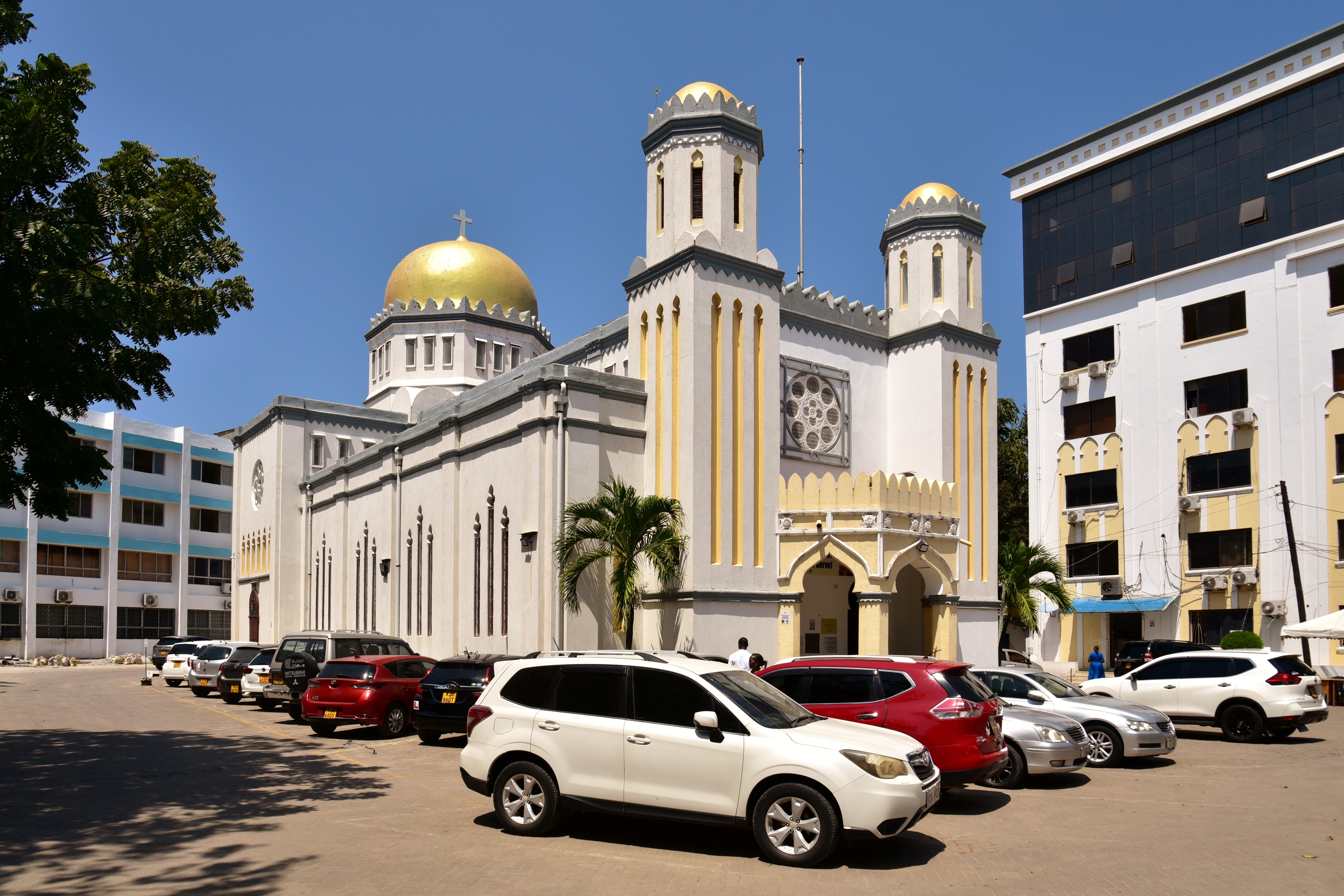
- Aerial view of the Island Mji Wa Kale Fort Jesus Mombasa tusks Nyali beach Mandhry Mosque Haller Park Mombasa Memorial Cathedral
- Nicknames: Mwambao; Arab Town; The city of dreams; The blue and white city; The city that never sleeps; Gateway to East Africa; The old capital
- Interactive map of Mombasa
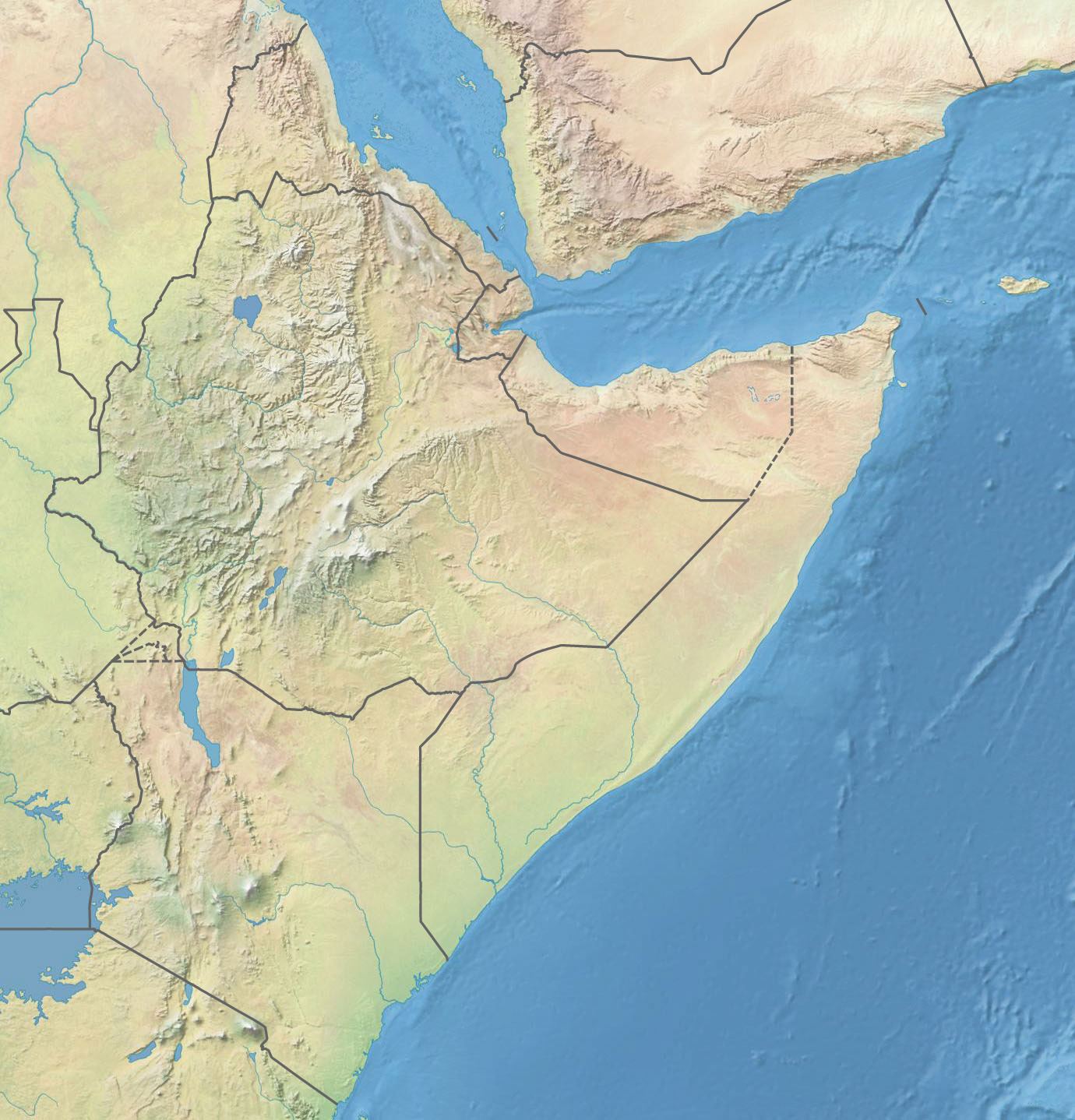
- Location within Kenya Location within the Horn of Africa Location within Africa
- Coordinates: 4°03′S 39°40′E
- Country: Kenya
- County: Mombasa County
- Founded: 900 AD

Government
  - Type: County Government
  - Body: County Assembly
  - Governor: Abdulsamad Shariff Nassir

Area
  - Land: 219.9 km^{2} (84.9 sq mi)
- Elevation: 50 m (160 ft)

Population (2020)
  - City and city county: 1,311,860
  - Rank: 2nd in Kenya
  - Density: 5,495/km^{2} (14,230/sq mi)
  - Urban: 1,388,449
  - Metro: 1,553,000

GDP (PPP)
  - Total: ▲$13.132 billion (2nd)(2022)
  - Per Capita: ▲$10,227 (2022) (2nd)

GDP (NOMINAL)
  - Total: ▲$4.822 billion (2022) (2nd)
  - Per Capita: ▲$3,755 (2022) (2nd)
- Time zone: UTC+3 (EAT)
- Area code: 020
- Climate: Aw
- Website: mombasa.go.ke

Mombasa (/mɒmˈbæsə/ mom-BASS-ə; also US: /-ˈbɑːsə/ -BAH-sə) is a coastal city in southeastern Kenya along the Indian Ocean. It was the first capital of British East Africa, before Nairobi was elevated to capital status in 1907. It now serves as the capital of Mombasa County. Buildings in the Central Business District are blue and white, representing the Indian Ocean. It is the country's oldest (c. 900 A.D.) and second-largest city after Nairobi, with a population of about 1,208,333 people according to the 2019 census.

Mombasa's location on the Indian Ocean made it a historic trading centre, and it has been controlled by many countries because of its strategic location. Kenyan school history books place the founding of Mombasa as 900 AD. It must have already been a prosperous trading town in the 12th century, as the Arab geographer al-Idrisi mentions it in 1151. It was a part of the Kilwa Sultanate from approximately the early 14th century until the dissolution of the sultanate in 1513. The oldest stone mosque in Mombasa, Mnara, was built c. 1300. The Mandhry Mosque, built in 1570, has a minaret that contains a regionally specific ogee arch. The city later came under the occupation and control of the Omani Empire in the late 17th century.

In the late pre-colonial period, it was the metropolis of a plantation society, which became dependent on slave labour based around the ivory trade. Throughout the early modern period, Mombasa was a key node in the complex and far-reaching Indian Ocean trading networks. Its key exports then were ivory, millet, sesamum and coconuts.

Today, Mombasa is a tourism-based town, home to one of the state houses, with an extra-large port and an international airport.

== History ==
Historical affiliations

Sultan of Mombasa Before 1300
Kilwa Sultanate 1300–1513
Ottoman Empire 1586-1589
Portuguese Empire 1593–1698
Sultanate of Oman 1698–1728
Portuguese Empire 1728–1729
Sultanate of Oman 1729–1824
British Empire 1824–1826
Sultanate of Zanzibar 1826–1887
British East Africa/Kenya 1887–1963
Kenya 1963–present

=== Ancient and medieval ===
The founding of Mombasa is associated with two rulers: Mwana Mkisi and Shehe Mvita. According to legend, Mwana Mkisi is the original ancestor of Mombasa's oldest lineages within Thenashara Taifa (or Twelve Nations). Families associated with the Twelve Nations are still considered the original inhabitants of the city. Mwana Mkisi was a queen from the pre-Islamic era, who founded Kongowea, the original urban settlement on Mombasa Island.

Significantly, the names of both the queen and the city have linguistic and spiritual connections with Central Africa. "Mkisi" is considered the personification of "ukisi", which means "the holy" in kiKongo. "Kongowea" can similarly be interpreted as the Swahili locative of "kongo", which denotes the essence of civilizational order in central Africa. These legends can be read as an acknowledgement of the Bantu-speaking origins of the Swahili people.

Shehe Mvitaff superseded the dynasty of Mwana Mkisi and established the first permanent stone mosque on Mombasa Island. Mombasa's oldest extant stone mosque, Mnara, was built c. 1300. Shehe Mvita is remembered as a Muslim of great learning and so is connected more directly with the present ideals of Swahili culture that people identify with Mombasa. The ancient history associated with Mwana Mkisi and Shehe Mvita and the founding of an urban settlement on Mombasa Island is still linked to present-day peoples living in Mombasa. The Thenashara Taifa (or Twelve Nations) Swahili lineages recount this ancient history today and are the keepers of local Swahili traditions.

Most of the early information on Mombasa comes from the writings of Portuguese chroniclers in the 16th century.

The famous Moroccan scholar and traveller Ibn Battuta (1304 – 1368/1369) visited the area during his travels to the Swahili Coast. He noted the city, although he stayed only one night. He wrote that the people of Mombasa were Shafi'i Muslims, religious people, trustworthy and righteous. Their mosques were made of wood, expertly built.

The exact founding date of the city is unknown, but it has a long history. Kenyan school history books place the founding of Mombasa as 900. It must have been already a prosperous trading town in the 12th century, as the Arab geographer al-Idrisi mentions it in 1151. The oldest stone mosque in Mombasa, Mnara, was built c. 1300. The Mandhry Mosque, built in 1570, has a minaret that contains a regionally specific ogee arch. This suggests that Swahili architecture was an indigenous African product rather than being adopted from non-African Muslims who brought stone architecture to the Swahili coast.

During the pre-modern period, Mombasa was an important centre for the trade in spices, gold, and ivory. Its trade links reached as far as India and China. Oral historians today can still recount this period of local history. Indian history shows that there were trade links between Mombasa and Cholas of South India. Throughout the early modern period, Mombasa was a key node in the complex and far-reaching Indian Ocean trading networks. Its key exports were ivory, millet, sesamum and coconuts.

Ivory caravans remained a major source of economic prosperity. Mombasa became the major port city of pre-colonial Kenya in the Middle Ages and was used to trade with other African port cities, the Persian Empire, the Arabian Peninsula, India and China.

The 16th century Portuguese voyager Duarte Barbosa wrote:

"[Mombasa] is a place of great traffic and has a good harbour in which there are always moored small craft of many kinds and also great ships, both of which are bound from Sofala and others which come from Cambay and Melinde and others which sail to the island of Zanzibar."

=== Portuguese domination ===
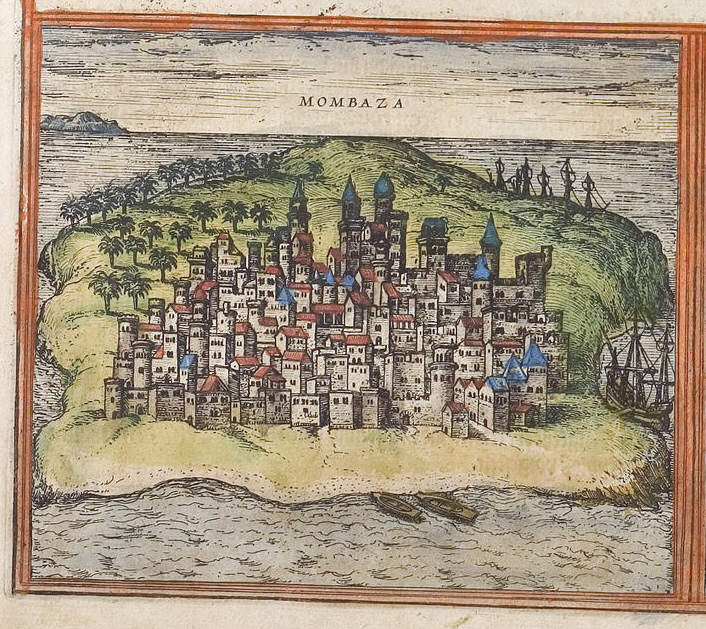
Mombasa was under Portuguese rule from 1593 to 1698 and again from 1728 to 1729. Portuguese presence in Kenya lasted from 1498 until 1730.

Vasco da Gama was the first known European to visit Mombasa, receiving a chilly reception in 1498. Two years later, the town was sacked by the Portuguese. In 1502, the sultanate became independent from Kilwa Kisiwani and was renamed as Mvita (in Swahili) or Manbasa (Arabic).

The Portuguese had since had encounters with the city several times; first under Francisco de Almeida in 1505, later under Afonso de Albuquerque in 1522 to quell an attempted mutiny by the sultan's nephew in Pemba and Zanzibar, and finally the destruction of the city under Nuno da Cunha again in 1528 after the Malindi sultan failed to pay tribute.

In 1585, a military expedition of the Ottoman Empire, led by Emir 'Ali Bey, successfully captured Mombasa, and other coastal cities in Southeast Africa from the Portuguese. However, Malindi remained loyal to Portugal. The Zimba overcame the towns of Sena and Tete on the Zambezi, and in 1587 they took Kilwa, killing 3,000 people. At Mombasa, the Zimba slaughtered the Muslim inhabitants, but they were halted at Malindi by the Bantu-speaking Segeju and went home. This stimulated the Portuguese to take over Mombasa a third time in 1589, and four years later they built Fort Jesus to administer the region. Between Lake Malawi and the Zambezi mouth, Kalonga Mzura made an alliance with the Portuguese in 1608 and fielded 4,000 warriors to help defeat their rival Zimba, who were led by chief Lundi.

After the building of Fort Jesus, Mombasa was put by the Portuguese under the rule of members of the ruling family of Malindi. In 1631 Dom Jeronimo, the ruler of Mombasa, slaughtered the Portuguese garrison in the city and defeated the relief force sent by the Portuguese. In 1632 Dom Jeronimo left Mombasa and became a pirate. That year the Portuguese returned and established direct rule over Mombasa.

=== Omani rule ===
With the capture of Fort Jesus in 1698, the town came under the influence of the Imamate of Oman, subordinate to the Omani rulers on the island of Unguja, prompting regular local rebellions. Oman appointed three consecutive Governors (Wali in Arabic, Liwali in Swahili):

- 12 December 1698 – December 1698: Imam Sa'if ibn Sultan
- December 1698 – 1728: Nasr ibn Abdallah al-Mazru'i
- 1728–12 March 1728: Shaykh Rumba

Mombasa was briefly returned to Portuguese rule by captain-major Álvaro Caetano de Melo Castro (12 March 1728 – 21 September 1729), then four new Omani Liwali until 1746, when the last of them made it independent again (disputed by Oman), as the first of its recorded Sultans:

- 1746–1755: 'Ali ibn Uthman al-Mazru'i
- 1755–1773: Masud ibn Nasr al-Mazru'i
- 1773–1782: Abdallah ibn Muhammad al-Mazru'i
- 1782–1811: Ahmad ibn Muhammad al-Mazru'i (born 17–died 1814)
- 1812–1823: 'Abdallah ibn Ahmad al-Mazru'i (died 1823)
- 1823–1826: Sulayman ibn 'Ali al-Mazru'i

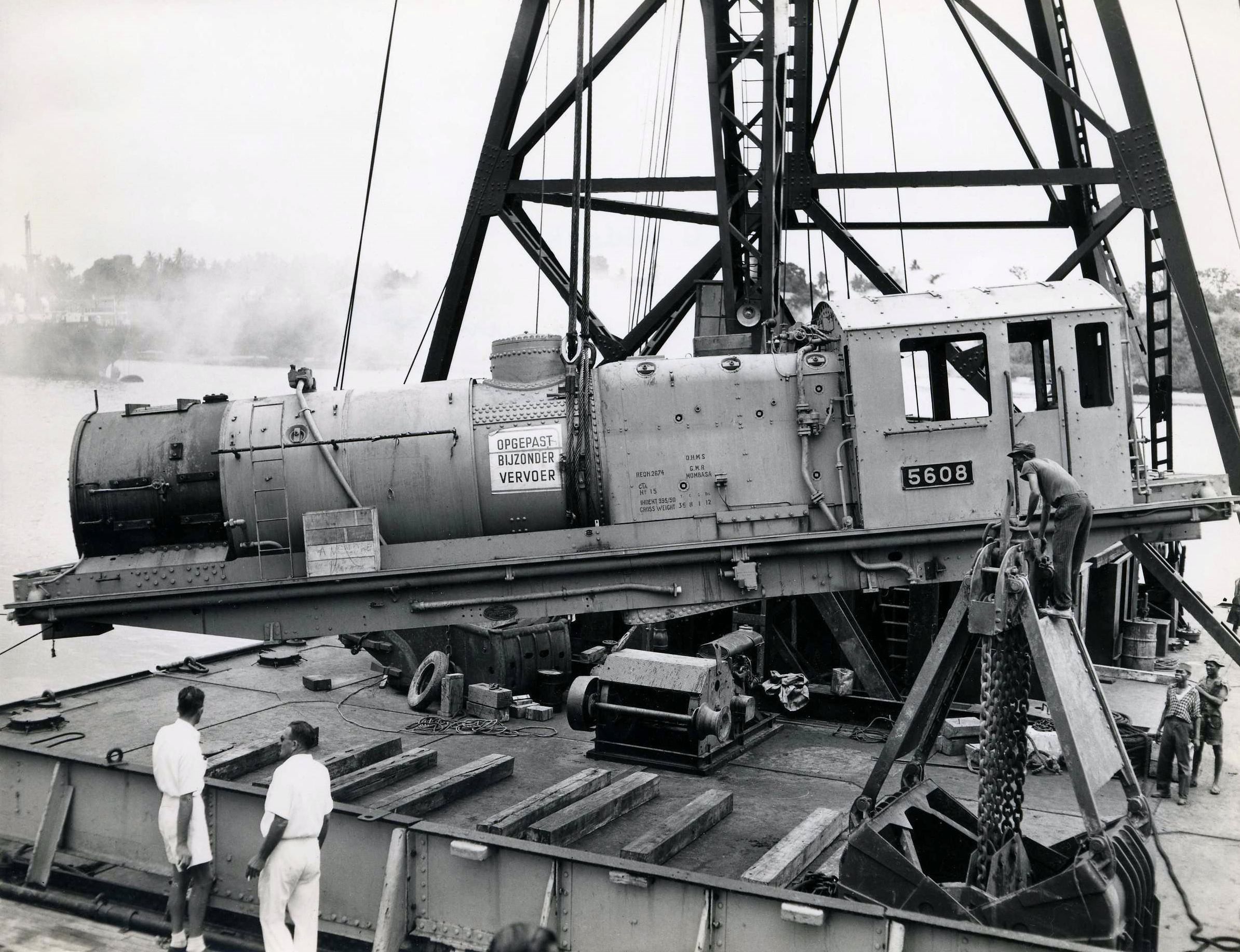
A newly constructed East African Railways Beyer Garratt locomotive being unloaded at Mombasa, c. 1953

From 9 February 1824 to 25 July 1826, there was a British protectorate over Mombasa, represented by governors. Omani rule was restored in 1826; seven liwalis where appointed. On 24 June 1837, it was nominally annexed by Said bin Sultan of Muscat and Oman.

=== British rule and independence ===
On 25 May 1887 Mombasa was relinquished to the British East Africa Association, later the Imperial British East Africa Company. It came under British administration in 1895. It soon became the capital of the British East Africa Protectorate and the sea terminal of the Uganda Railway, construction of which was started in 1896. Many workers were brought in from British India to build the railway, and the city's fortunes revived. The Sultan of Zanzibar formally presented the town to the British in 1898.

Mombasa became the capital of the Kenya Colony Protectorate of Kenya, sometime between 1887 and around 1906. The capital was later moved because medical officers warned that the ground was swampy, and urged Sir James Hayes Sadler, then Commissioner of the East Africa Protectorate, to plead with London to move the town elsewhere to mitigate potential disease. Nairobi has since been Kenya's capital to date.

The Mombasa tusks, one of the city's best-known monuments, were originally constructed in 1952 by the British administration of the Kenya Colony, commemorating the visit of Queen Elizabeth II to the city.

In 2018, as part of an effort to increase tourism, Mombasa County Governor Hassan Joho issued a directive requiring that all buildings in the Old Town and the Central Business District be painted white with Egyptian blue trim and banned all signs from their walls or canopies. Transport, Infrastructure and Public Works County Executive Tawfiq Balala stated that the city wanted to be "the most photographed in Africa".

== Geography ==
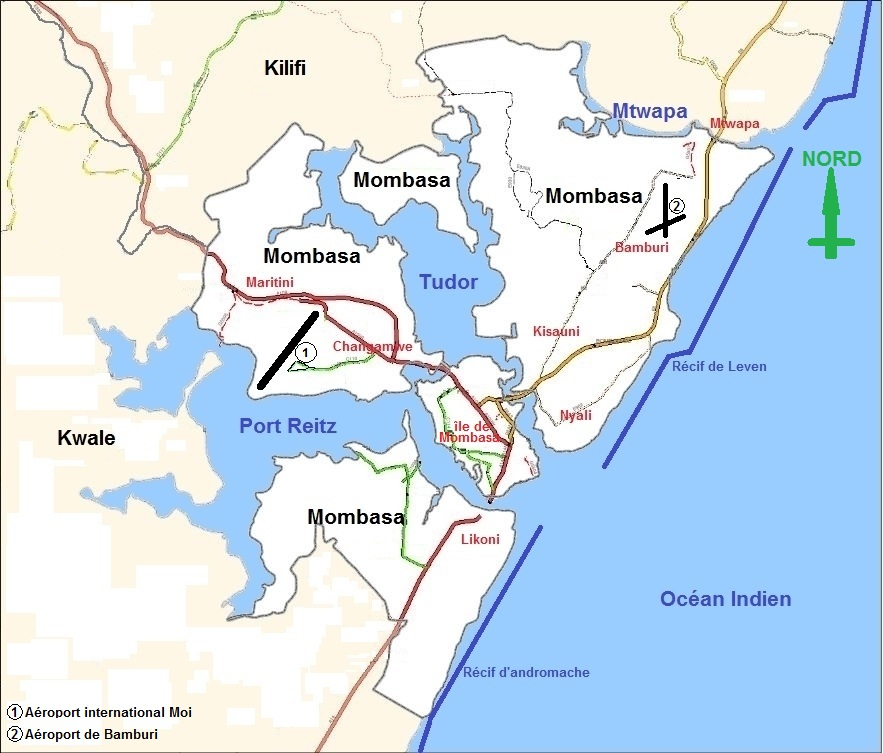
Map of Mombasa's extent.

Being a coastal town, Mombasa is characterised by a flat topography. The town of Mombasa is centred on Mombasa Island, but extends to the mainland. The island is separated from the mainland by two creeks, Port Reitz in the south and Tudor Creek in the north.

== Climate ==
Mombasa has a tropical wet and dry climate (Köppen: As; Trewartha: Asha). The amount of rainfall essentially depends on the season. The rainiest months are April and May, while rainfall is minimal between January and February.

Located near the equator, Mombasa has only a slight seasonal temperature variation, with high temperatures ranging 28.8–33.7 °C (83.8–92.7 °F).

As a seaport, Mombasa is subject to detrimental consequences of a fluctuating climate. In October 2006, Mombasa experienced a large flood that affected 60,000 people.

Like the rest of Kenya, climate change is already creating challenges for the city: coastal erosion has become a problem for infrastructure in Mombasa. Due to rising sea levels, the coastline has been eroding at 2.5–20 cm (0.98–7.87 in) per year. This has increased the number of annual floods.

Climate data for Mombasa (Moi International Airport) (1991–2020 normals, extremes 1890–present)
Month	Jan	Feb	Mar	Apr	May	Jun	Jul	Aug	Sep	Oct	Nov	Dec	Year
Record high °C (°F)	41.4 (106.5)	45.9 (114.6)	43.0 (109.4)	41.4 (106.5)	35.0 (95.0)	33.4 (92.1)	31.0 (87.8)	30.3 (86.5)	31.6 (88.9)	33.0 (91.4)	35.9 (96.6)	37.3 (99.1)	45.9 (114.6)
Mean daily maximum °C (°F)	32.8 (91.0)	33.0 (91.4)	33.3 (91.9)	32.0 (89.6)	29.7 (85.5)	29.3 (84.7)	28.7 (83.7)	28.4 (83.1)	29.1 (84.4)	30.0 (86.0)	30.9 (87.6)	32.3 (90.1)	30.8 (87.4)
Daily mean °C (°F)	27.7 (81.9)	28.1 (82.6)	28.7 (83.7)	27.7 (81.9)	26.1 (79.0)	25.4 (77.7)	24.4 (75.9)	24.5 (76.1)	25.1 (77.2)	26.2 (79.2)	27.2 (81.0)	27.7 (81.9)	26.6 (79.8)
Mean daily minimum °C (°F)	23.4 (74.1)	24.1 (75.4)	24.8 (76.6)	24.6 (76.3)	23.1 (73.6)	22.0 (71.6)	20.9 (69.6)	21.2 (70.2)	21.7 (71.1)	22.9 (73.2)	23.8 (74.8)	24.0 (75.2)	23.0 (73.5)
Record low °C (°F)	16.8 (62.2)	19.4 (66.9)	19.7 (67.5)	18.9 (66.0)	18.8 (65.8)	17.4 (63.3)	13.6 (56.5)	15.3 (59.5)	16.3 (61.3)	18.0 (64.4)	18.8 (65.8)	18.1 (64.6)	13.6 (56.5)
Average precipitation mm (inches)	33.9 (1.33)	14.0 (0.55)	55.6 (2.19)	154.3 (6.07)	235.5 (9.27)	88.3 (3.48)	71.8 (2.83)	68.2 (2.69)	67.2 (2.65)	103.4 (4.07)	104.7 (4.12)	75.8 (2.98)	1,072.7 (42.23)
Average precipitation days (≥ 1.0 mm)	3	1	5	10	14	10	10	8	9	9	8	7	94
Average relative humidity (%)	77	75	77	80	82	82	82	82	80	81	82	80	80
Mean monthly sunshine hours	269.7	254.8	269.7	225.0	204.6	207.0	210.8	244.9	246.0	272.8	264.0	260.4	2,929.7
Mean daily sunshine hours	8.7	9.1	8.7	7.5	6.6	6.9	6.8	7.9	8.2	8.8	8.8	8.4	8.0
Source 1: NOAA (precipitation and sun 1961–1990)
Source 2: Deutscher Wetterdienst (humidity 1962–1993), Meteo Climat (record highs and lows) Starlings Roost Weather

== Suburbs ==
Mombasa is located on Mombasa Island and sprawls to the surrounding mainlands. The island is separated from the mainland by two creeks: Tudor Creek and Kilindini Harbour. It is connected to the mainland to the north by the Nyali Bridge, to the south by the Likoni Ferry, and to the west by the Makupa Causeway, alongside which runs the Kenya-Uganda Railway. The port serves both Kenya and countries of the interior, linking them to the ocean. The city is served by Moi International Airport located in the northwest mainland suburb of Chaani.

=== Mombasa Island ===
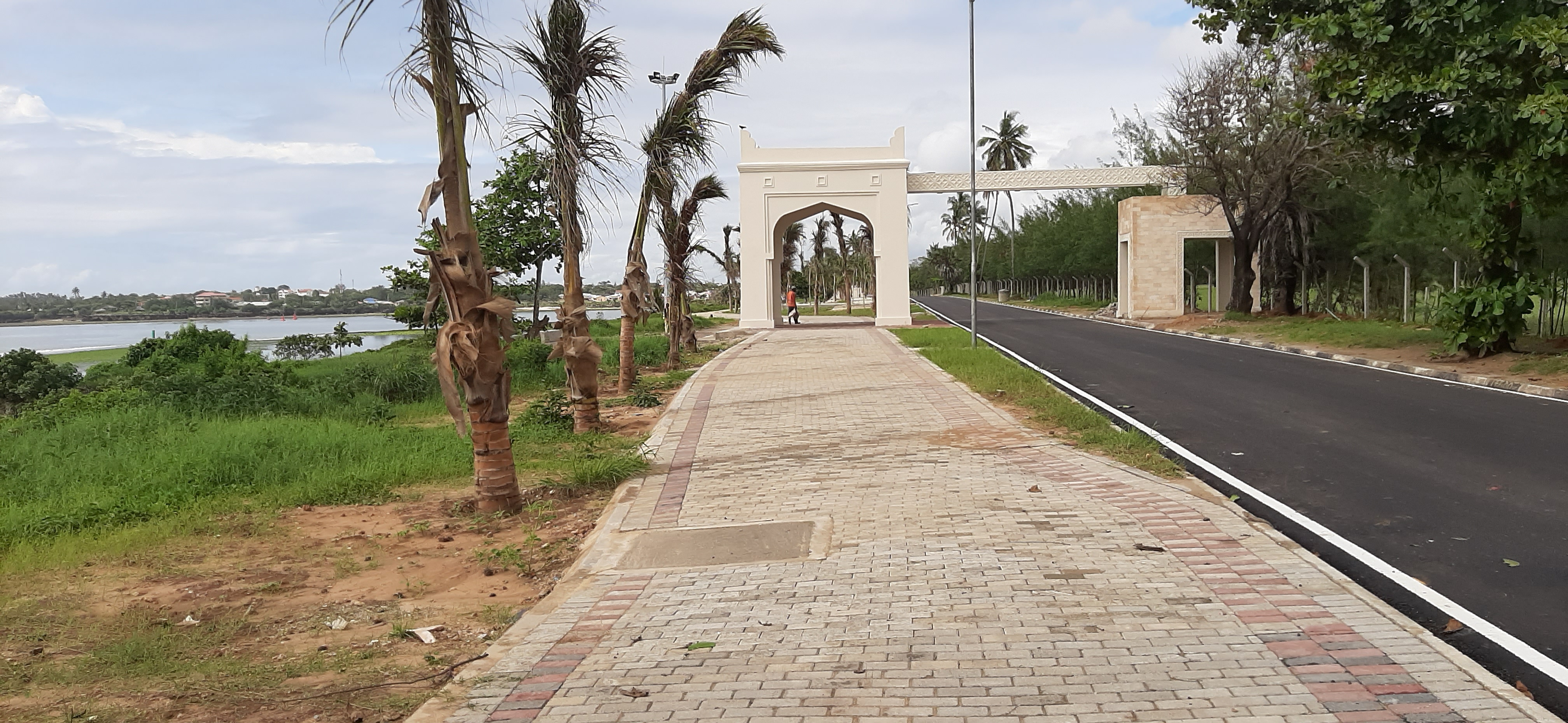
Renovated Mama Ngina Drive

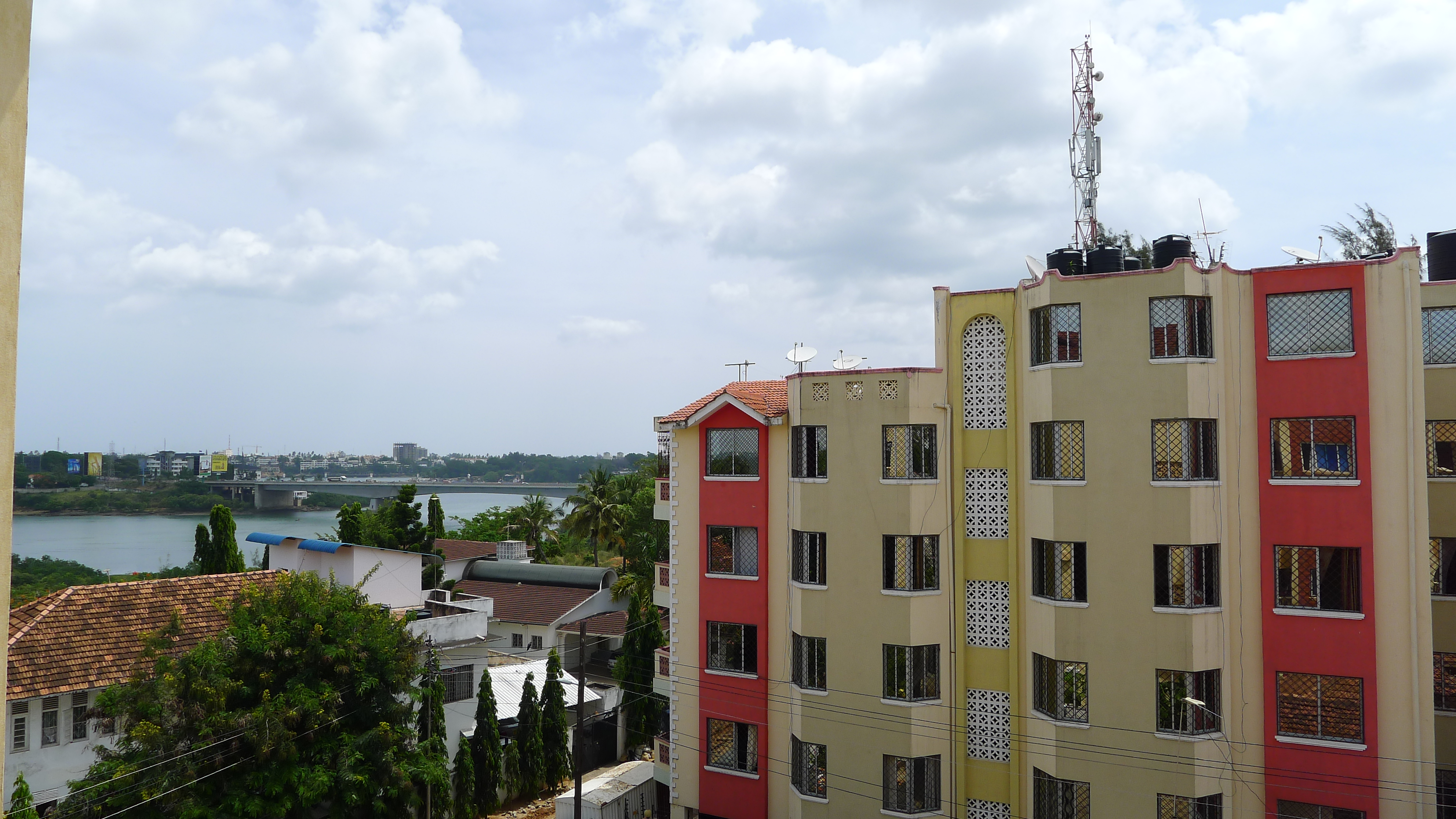
Tudor, Mombasa

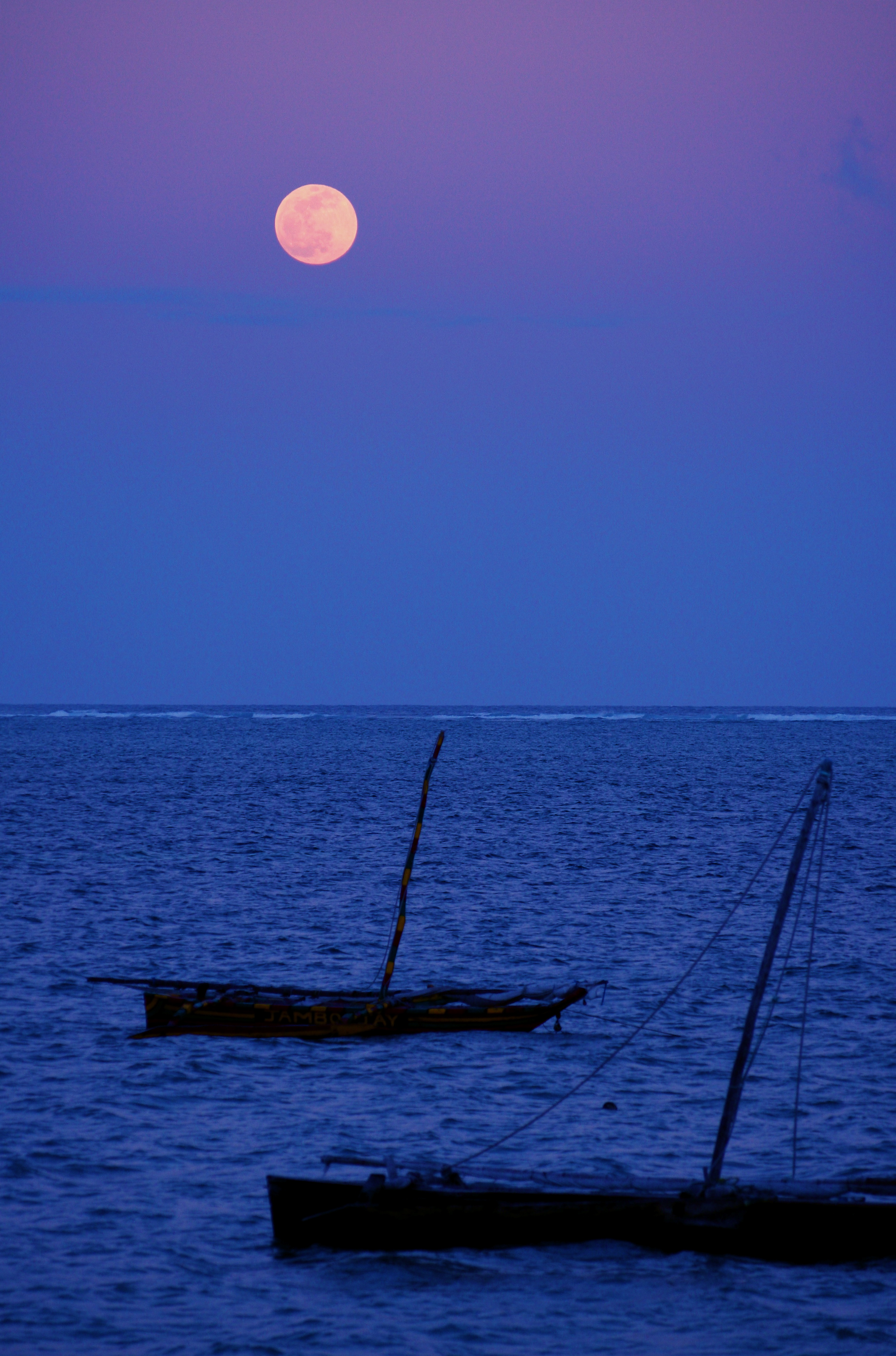
Moonlight view from Mombasa

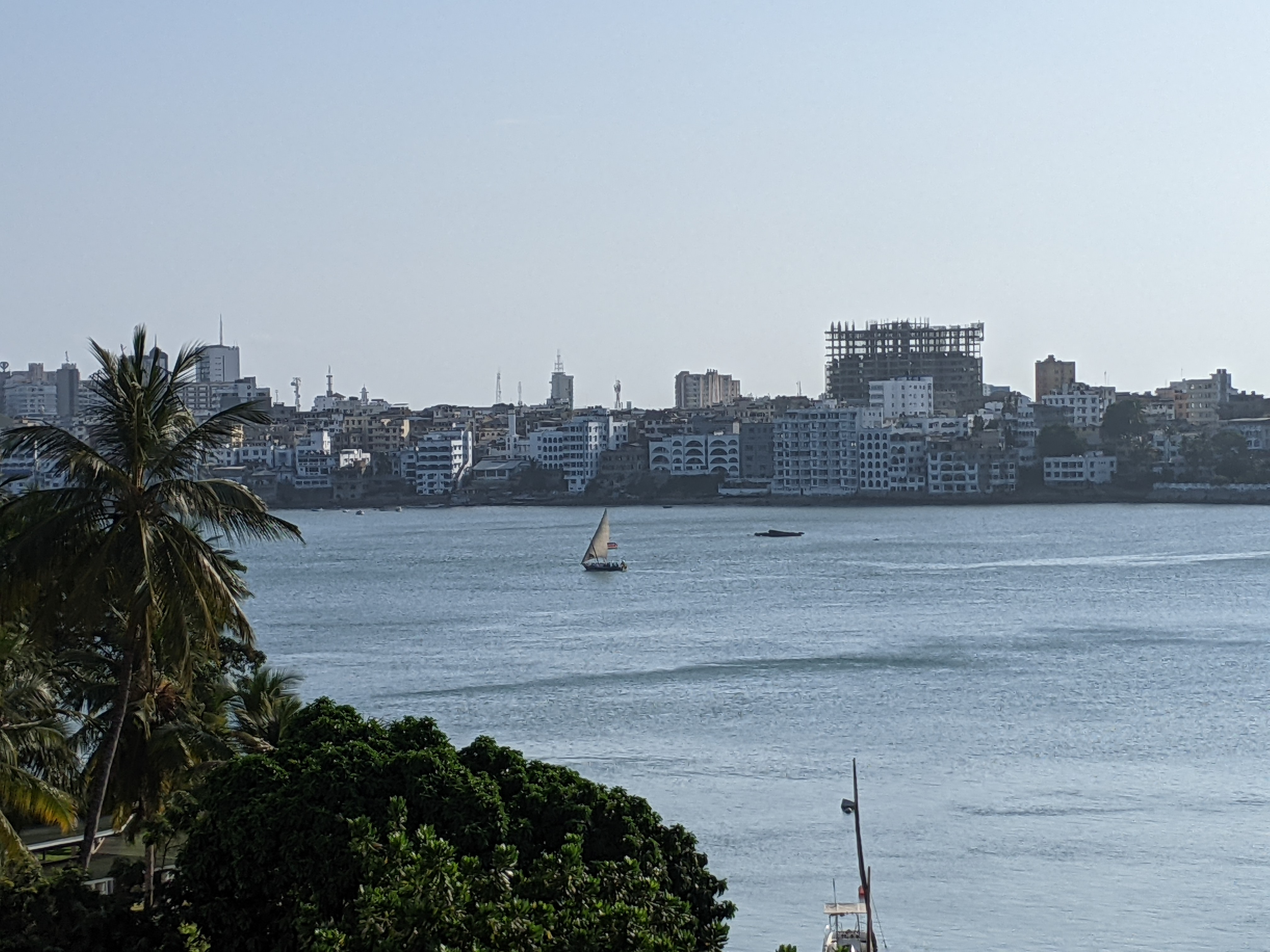
Old Town across Mombasa Harbour

==== Kizingo ====
Considered a prime residential area of Mombasa. The State House of Mombasa, Provincial Headquarters, The Mombasa Law Courts, and the Municipal Council are located in Kizingo. The Aga Khan Academy, Aga Khan High School, Serani Primary School, Serani High School, Santokben Nursery School, Coast Academy, Jaffery Academy, Mombasa Primary School, Loreto Convent, Mama Ngina Girls' High School and the Government Training Institute (GTI) Mombasa are all in Kizingo as well.

==== Central Business District ====
The Mombasa central business district across the TSS building roundabout, Moi Avenue, and Nyerere Avenue is densely populated. Organizations such as the Kenya Revenue Authority (KRA) and businesses such as Banks (ABSA, I&M Ltd, Bank of India Ltd), Insurance Firms (Nomura Insurance Brokers, Masumali Meghji Insurance), and Audit Firms (Anant Bhatt LLP, Pricewaterhouse Coopers LLP, Mazars LLP, Deloitte LLP, and PKF LLP) are located here.

==== Others ====
- Kibokoni: Part of Old Town with Swahili architecture. Fort Jesus is in Baghani.
- Englani: Part of Old town between Kibokoni and Makadara.
- Kuze: Part of Old Town with Swahili culture and architecture. Originally flourishing with Swahili people but becoming a more cosmopolitan neighbourhood.
- Makadara: Part of Old Town consisting of a high number of descendants of Baluchi former soldiers who settled within this area before it developed into a town. The name is derived from the Arabic words "Qadru r-Rahman" meaning "Decree of (God) the Merciful".
- Ganjoni: Primarily a middle class residential area, home of second biggest dry dock of Africa after the one in South Africa.
- Tudor: Another middle class residential area with homes and shops. The Technical University of Mombasa (TUM) is situated in this neighbourhood.

=== North Coast ===
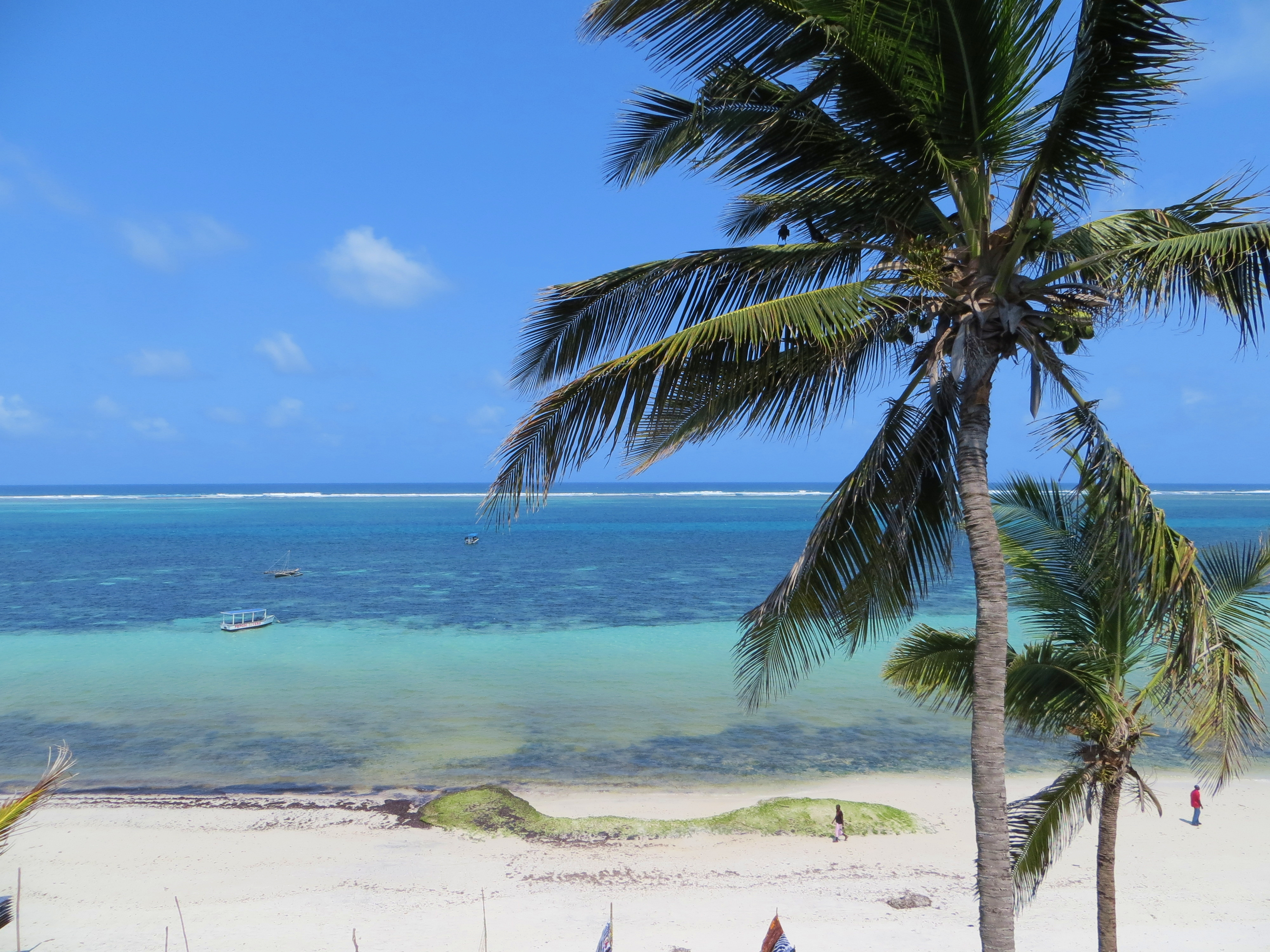
Seafront of Nyali Beach, north coast (from the Voyager Resort).

==== Nyali ====
Considered a prime and up-market residential area, it is on the mainland north of the island and is linked by the New Nyali Bridge. It has numerous beach front hotels in the area known as the "North Coast". Nyali has two distinct sections – the upmarket Old Nyali and the upcoming New Nyali. For many residents, Nyali has now become a self-contained residential area, with two Nakumatts, a multiplex cinema, shopping malls, banks, schools and post offices. This often eliminates the need for residents to cross the bridge and to go into the congested Mombasa city centre. Nyali is home for the Nyali Cinemax complex, Mamba Village, the Nyali Golf Club, and some of the most prestigious academic institutions of the Coast Province.

==== Kongowe ====
This is a densely populated area with 15 villages, two sub-locations and an estimated population of 106,180 residents. Kongowea is a cosmopolitan settlement mainly inhabited by people from mainland who migrated into the city in search of employment, mainly in service and manufacturing sector. The area is adjacent to the rich suburb of Nyali which employs a portion of the village residents. They are mainly hired as cheap labour as watchmen, gardeners, masons for up coming houses and house help. The most well known villages inside Kongowea include Kisumu Ndogo, Shauri Yako and Mnazi Mmoja, despite being located in this prime area, many residents live under extreme conditions – poor sanitation, high crime rate and lack of basic essential amenities like schools, hospitals and tap water. Kongowea is also home to one of the largest open-air markets in the African Great Lakes.

==== Bamburi ====
Bamburi is an outlying township (fifteen minutes drive) along the Malindi road. It is home to Bamburi Cement factory, the largest cement plant in the East African region. Other notable features in the area are the Jomo Kenyatta public beach, commonly known as Pirates, and Haller Park, a nature trail and wildlife conservatory. Kiembeni Estate, also in the Bamburi area, hosts around 100,000 residents. The estate has its own supermarket, several retail shops, salons and boutiques, and a number of licensed drinking dens. The establishments include The Shilla Bar, Turkey Base, Stars Garden and Sensera pub. Kiembeni is arguably the largest estate in Mombasa, and growing even faster.

Other areas include, Shanzu, Mkomani, Bombolulu, Kisauni and, across the Mtwapa creek, the popular area of Mtwapa, which is already located in Kilifi county.

=== South Coast ===
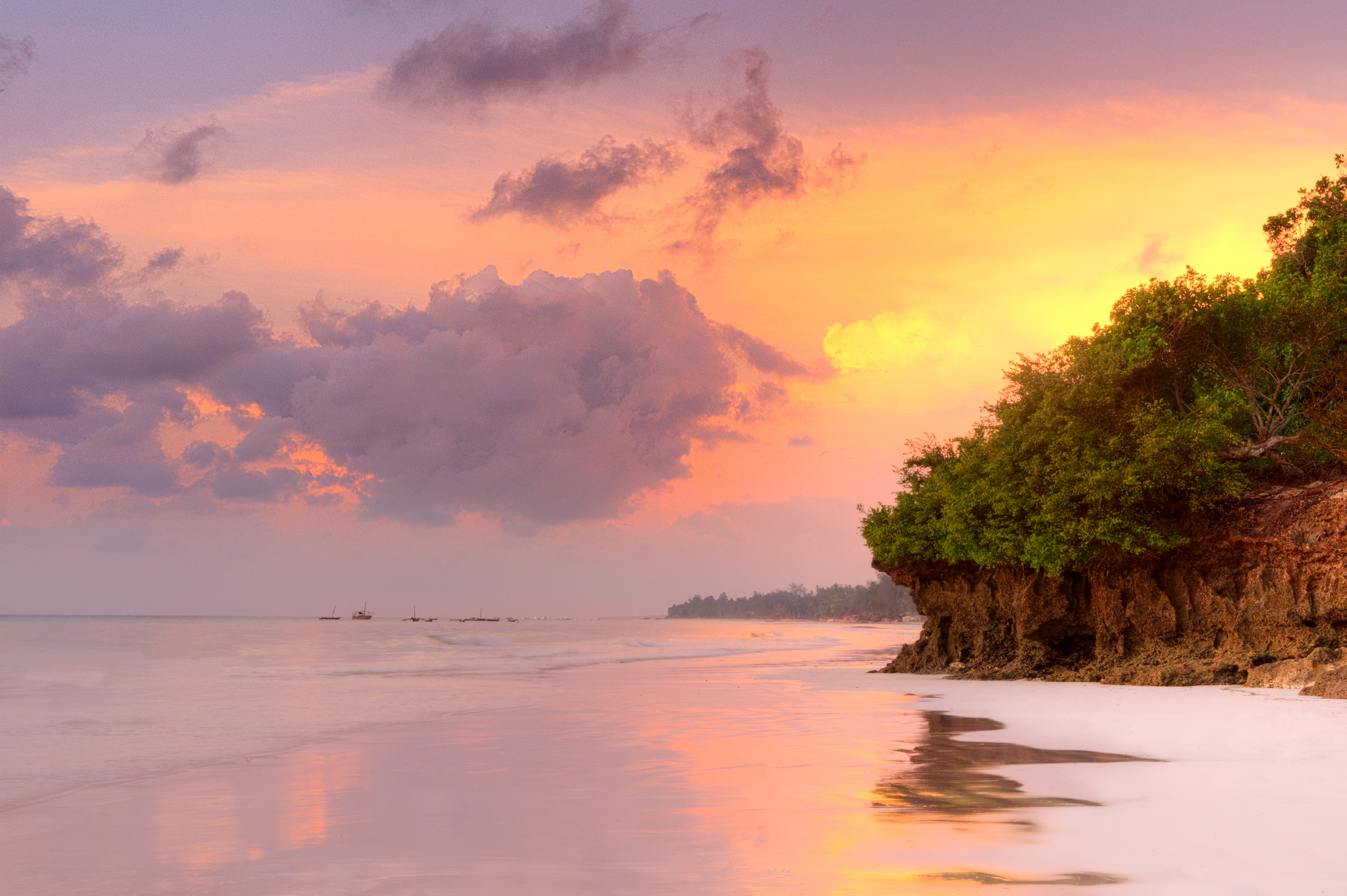
Diani Beach

Likoni: is a lower income and lower-middle-class neighbourhood connected to Mombasa Island by ferry. It is south of Mombasa Island and is made up of mostly Swahili and non-Swahili Bantu tribes. The ferry was the target of the Likoni Riots of 1997. The Liwatoni Pedestrian Floating Bridge was built and designed to ease pressure on the Likoni ferry crossing by taking up most of the foot traffic, leaving the ferries to serve vehicular and cargo crossing between Mombasa Island and the South Coast.

Diani Beach: a beach resort area situated over the Likoni Ferry on the south coast of Mombasa. It is located some 36 km (22 miles) south of Mombasa city on the mainland coast and is a prime resort for many local and international tourists. Diani Beach has an airport at Ukunda town to cater for tourists who fly there directly from Nairobi Wilson or any other airports and airfields in the country.

=== Mombasa Mainland ===
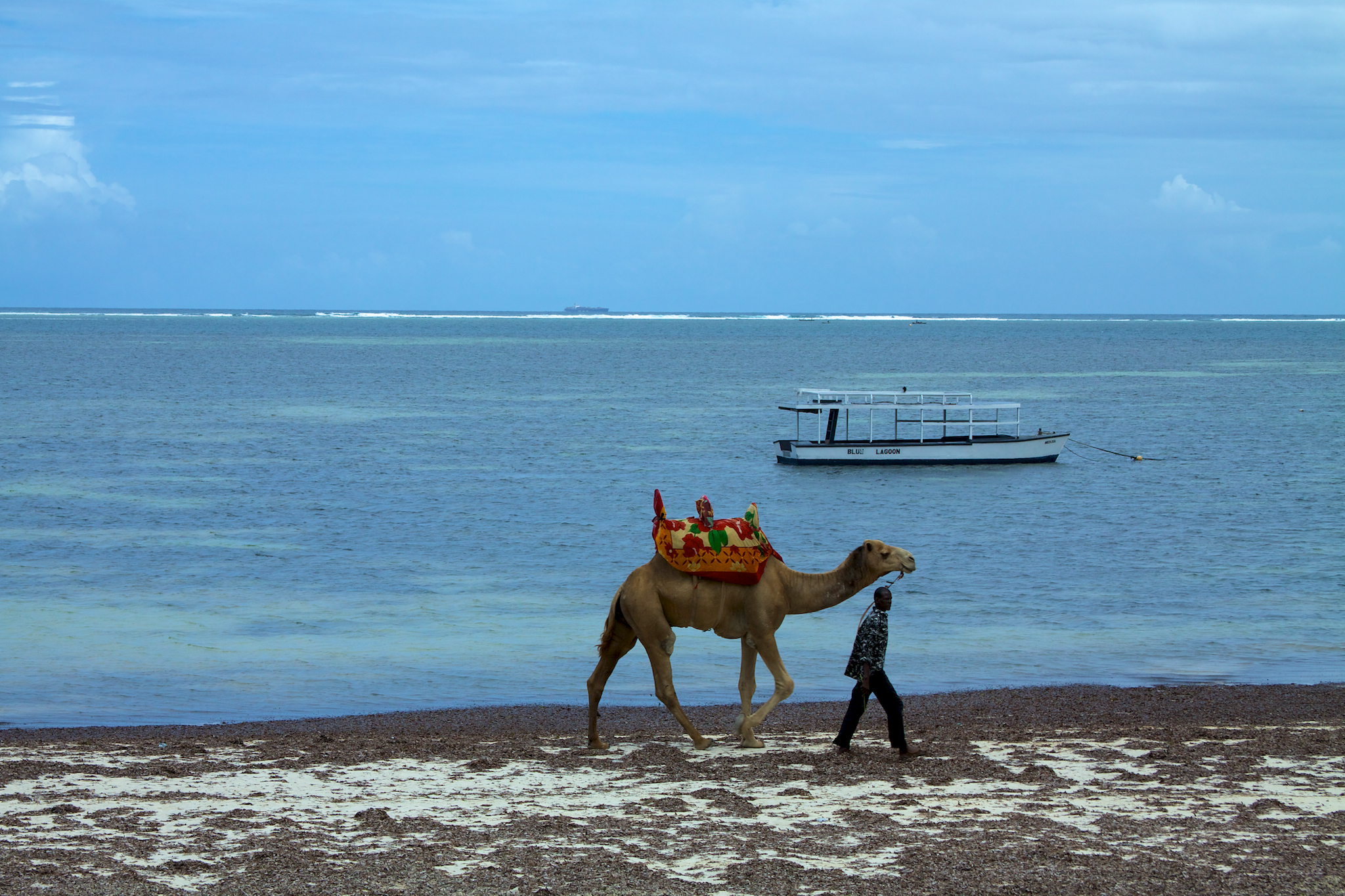
Among the many sellers and vendors along Mombasa's beaches, this man walked up and down all day hoping for tourists looking for camel rides.

==== Magongo ====
is an outlying township 20 minutes driving distance northwest of Mombasa Island, situated on the Nairobi Highway. This fringe community lacks any effective electricity, water or sewer systems, with a general lack of infrastructure. Poverty, lack of sanitation, and unemployment continue to be the greatest issues for the Mikindani Township, which have ensured low health and safety standards for its residents. Poor, lower class housing is widespread, ranging from simple stone, two-storey structures to mud and earth homes fitted with corrugated iron roofs. Much of the community works outside of the township, within Mombasa Island itself as there is a lack of employment and industry. There are a number of small health clinics, shops, and a few public primary schools: Nazarene primary is one school, which is known in particular as being staffed by a revolving volunteer teacher base from Western, and predominately English speaking nations. This small town serves as a link between the city and Moi International Airport. Magongo is also home to the Akamba Handicraft Cooperative.

==== Others ====
- Mikindani suburb: This is an outlying township on the mainland along the Nairobi Highway. It is built in the heavy industrial sections of Changamwe and mainly accommodate the working class who either work in the industries, the town centre on the Island and the Port at Kilindini harbour.
- Miritini: outlying township on the Mombasa Nairobi Highway which is first growing as a suburban area.
- Changamwe: Industrial area which contains the Kipevu power generation projects, the Kenya Oil Refinery Company facility and housing estates such as Chaani and is the gateway to the Moi International Airport. The area has administrative offices of the D.O and the chiefs who serve the administrative division.
- Migadini and Chaani: They are two adjacent estate that are located east of Airport road and east of Kenya Port Authority. They are bordered by Port Reitz, Magongo and KPA.
- Port Reitz: Is a suburb on the mainland which contains a beach, oil refineries, housing estates etc. Moi International Airport and the Port Reitz District Hospital are in Port Reitz.

== Demography ==
Religion in Mombasa County (2019 census)
1. Christianity (56.4%)
2. Islam (37.3%)
3. Other (7.30%)

Mombasa city has a population of 1,208,333 per the 2019 census.

Mombasa has a cosmopolitan population, with the Swahili people and Mijikenda predominant. Other communities include the Akamba and Taita Bantus as well as a significant population of Luo and Luhya. Gusii, Agikuyu, peoples from Western Kenya. The major religions practised in the city are Christianity and Islam. Over the centuries, many immigrants and traders have settled in Mombasa, particularly from the Middle East.

Historical population
Year	Pop.	±%
1969	247,073	—
1979	341,148	+38.1%
1989	461,753	+35.4%
1999	665,018	+44.0%
2009	939,370	+41.3%
2019	1,208,333	+28.6%

== Economy ==
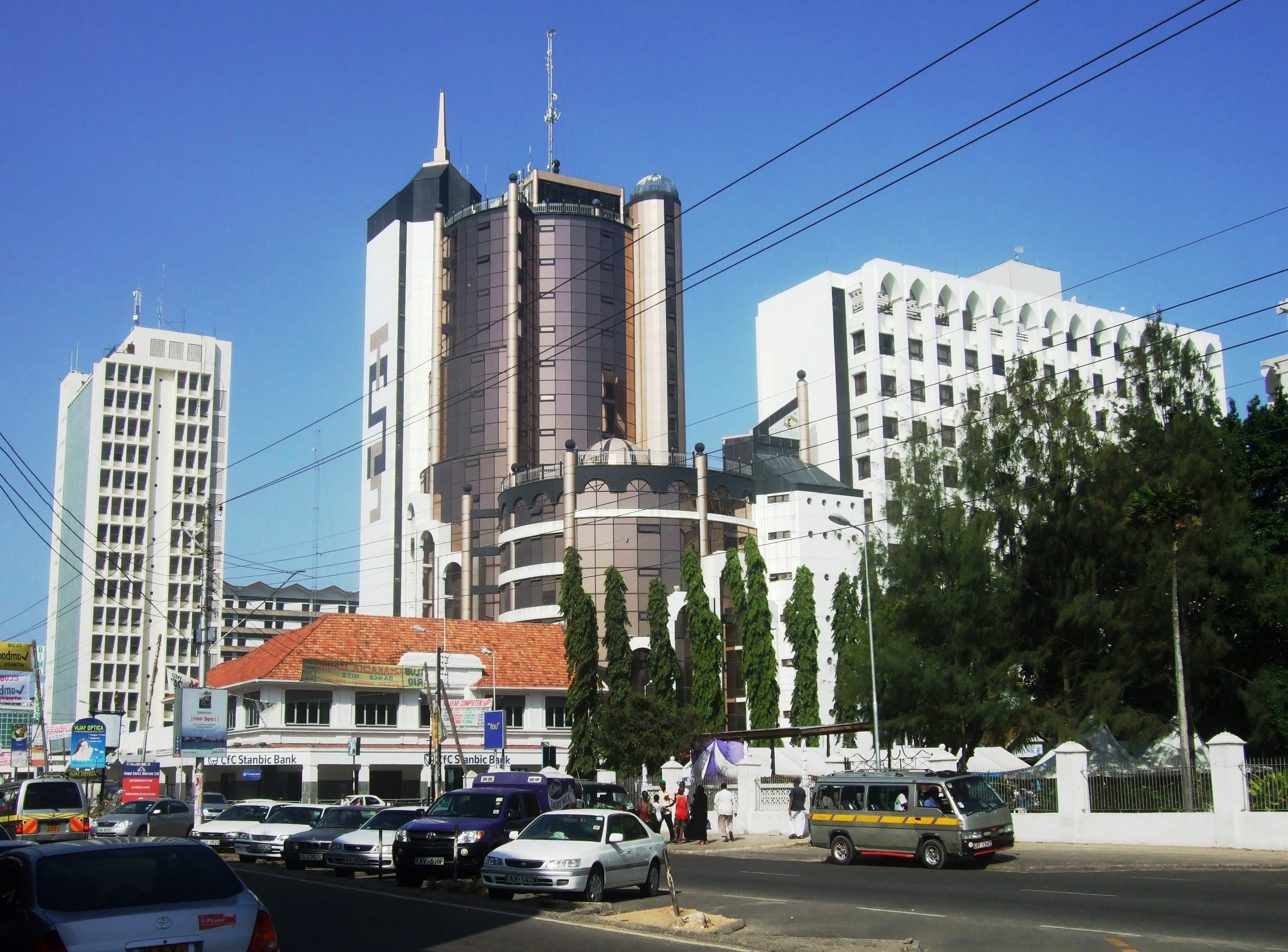
Downtown Mombasa

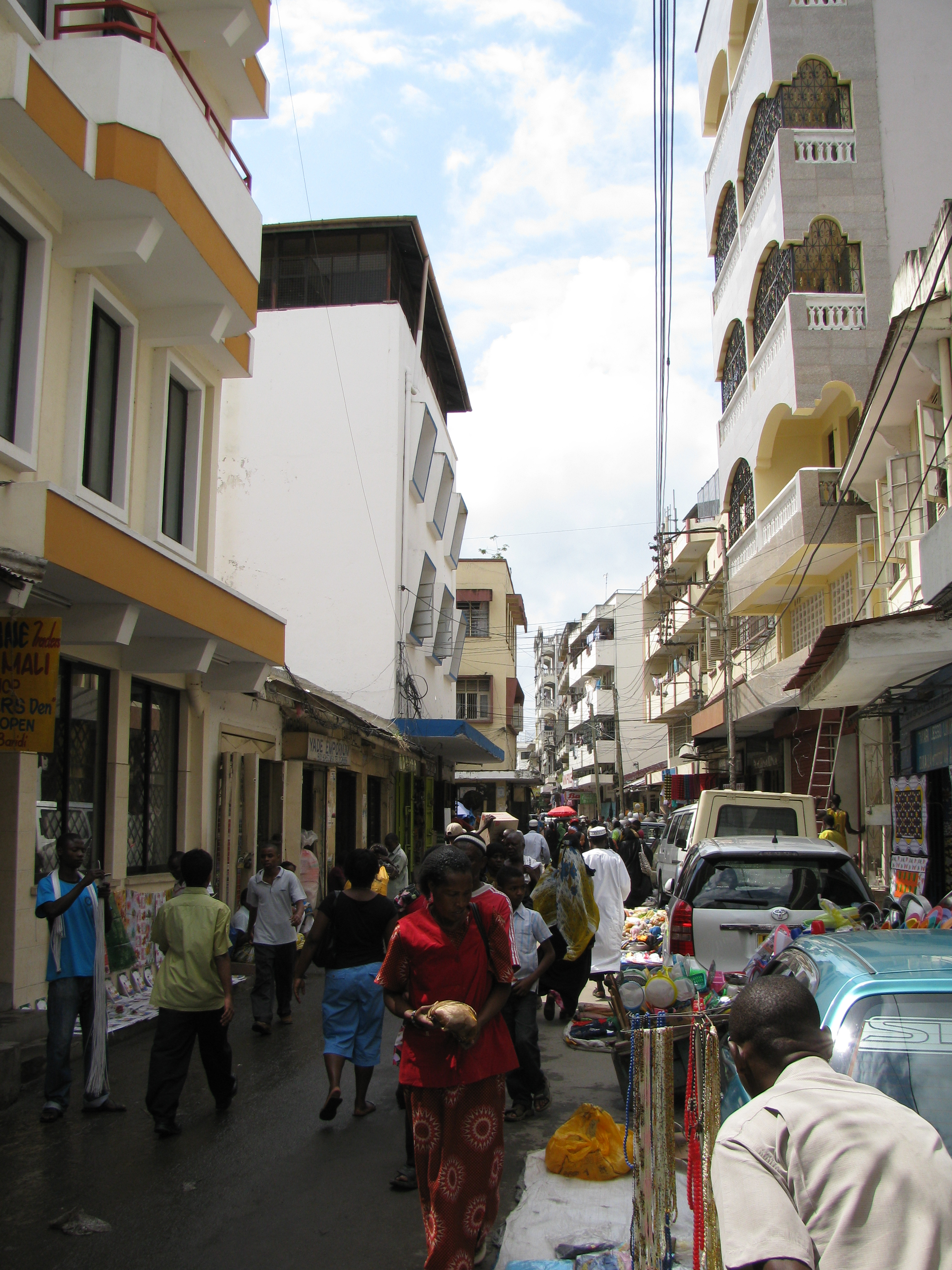
Biashara Street, Mombasa

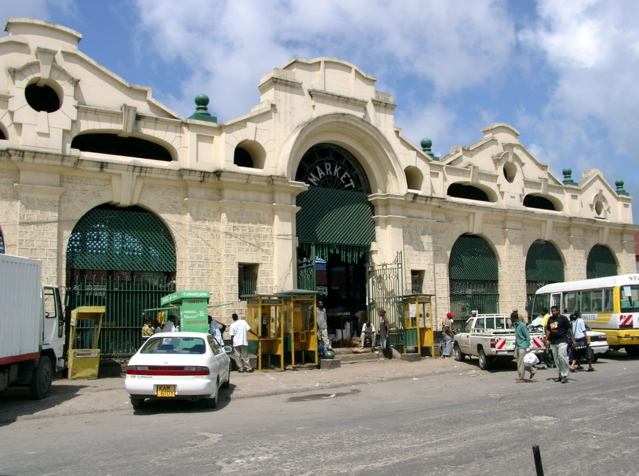
The Market Hall in Mombasa, Kenya, where many goods, especially spices are sold.

Mombasa is an important economic centre in Kenya. In addition to the coffee trade, the food and chemical industries, there is a steel mill, an aluminum rolling mill, an oil refinery and a cement plant. The city is home to the most important seaport in East Africa, Kilindini Harbour, which is also used by the neighbouring countries Tanzania and Uganda for their imports and exports.

Kilindini is an old Swahili term meaning "deep". The port is so-called because the channel is naturally very deep. Kilindini Harbour is an example of a natural geographic phenomenon called a ria, formed at the end of the last glacial period when the sea level rose and engulfed a river that was flowing from the mainland.

Mombasa is a centre of coastal tourism in Kenya. Mombasa Island itself is not a main attraction, although many people visit the Old Town and Fort Jesus. The Nyali, Bamburi, and Shanzu beaches are located north of the city. The Shelly, Tiwi, and Diani beaches are located south of Mombasa. Several luxury hotels exist on these beaches, while the less expensive hotels are located further away.

Mombasa's northern shoreline is renowned for its vibrant 24-hour entertainment offers, including both family entertainment (water parks, cinemas, bowling, etc.), sports (watersports, mountain biking and gokarting), culinary offers (restaurants offering a wide range of specialties from Kenya, China, Japan, India, Italy, Germany and other countries) and nightlife (bars, pubs, clubs, discothèques, etc.).

Other local industries include an oil refinery with a capacity of 80,000 barrels (13 ML) a day, and a cement factory capable of producing over 1.1 million tons per year. The major intercontinental undersea telecom cables reach shore next to Mombasa, connecting the African Great Lakes to the rest of the world and supporting a fast-growing call centre business in the area. The estimated real GDP growth for Kenya in 2016 is 5.7-6.0%. This growth will be in response to the construction of a railway system from Nairobi to Mombasa which will aid in trade and transportation between Kenya's two major cities.

Mombasa will become a Special Economic Zone (SEZ) in which certain industries such as tea, garments, and footwear will be exempt from certain taxes to promote domestic growth. This is in response to the deficiencies in Export Processing Zones (EPZ).

The Kenyan Dock Worker's Union is situated in Mombasa and has roughly 5,000 members.

President Kenyatta has made it a priority to deepen economic ties with Asia at the onset of his presidency. Japan has played a role in financially sponsoring the expansion of the Mombasa port in phase one and two of the expansion project.

At 44%, the rate of youth unemployment in Mombasa is more than double the national average of 21% (2016).

== Transport ==
=== Air ===
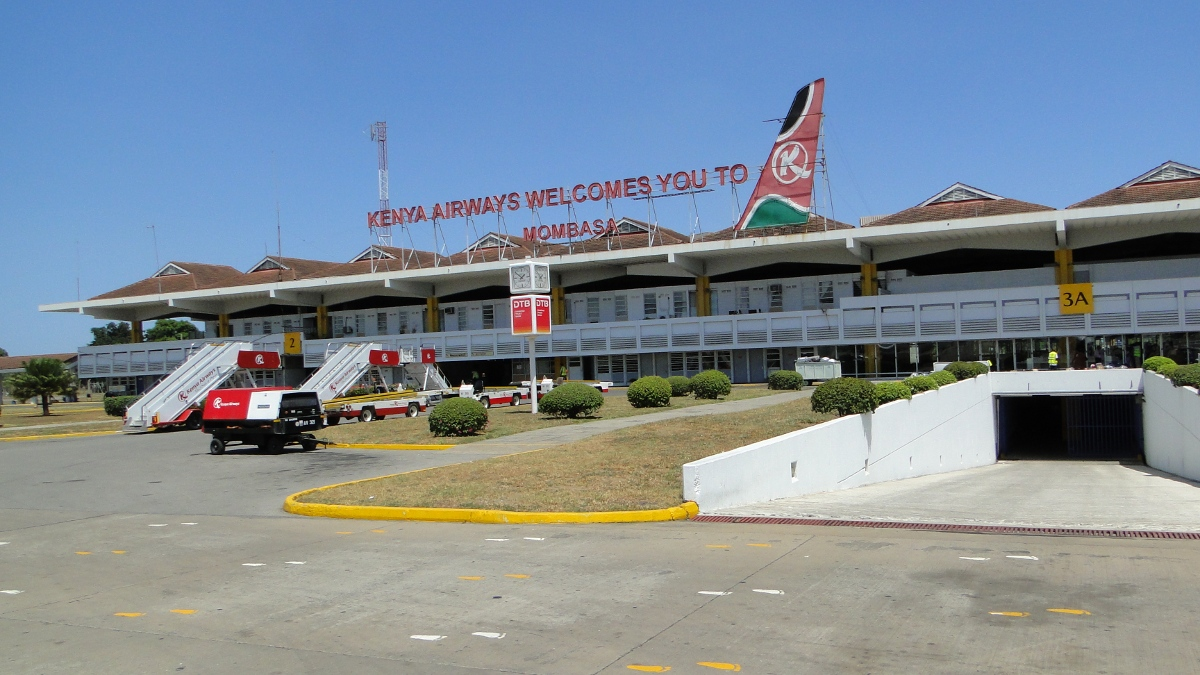
Moi International Airport

Moi International Airport is located in the city of Mombasa, and is the second largest airport in Kenya with daily flights to Nairobi and other Kenyan, European and Middle Eastern destinations. The airport also handles a large amount of air cargo through its freight terminal.

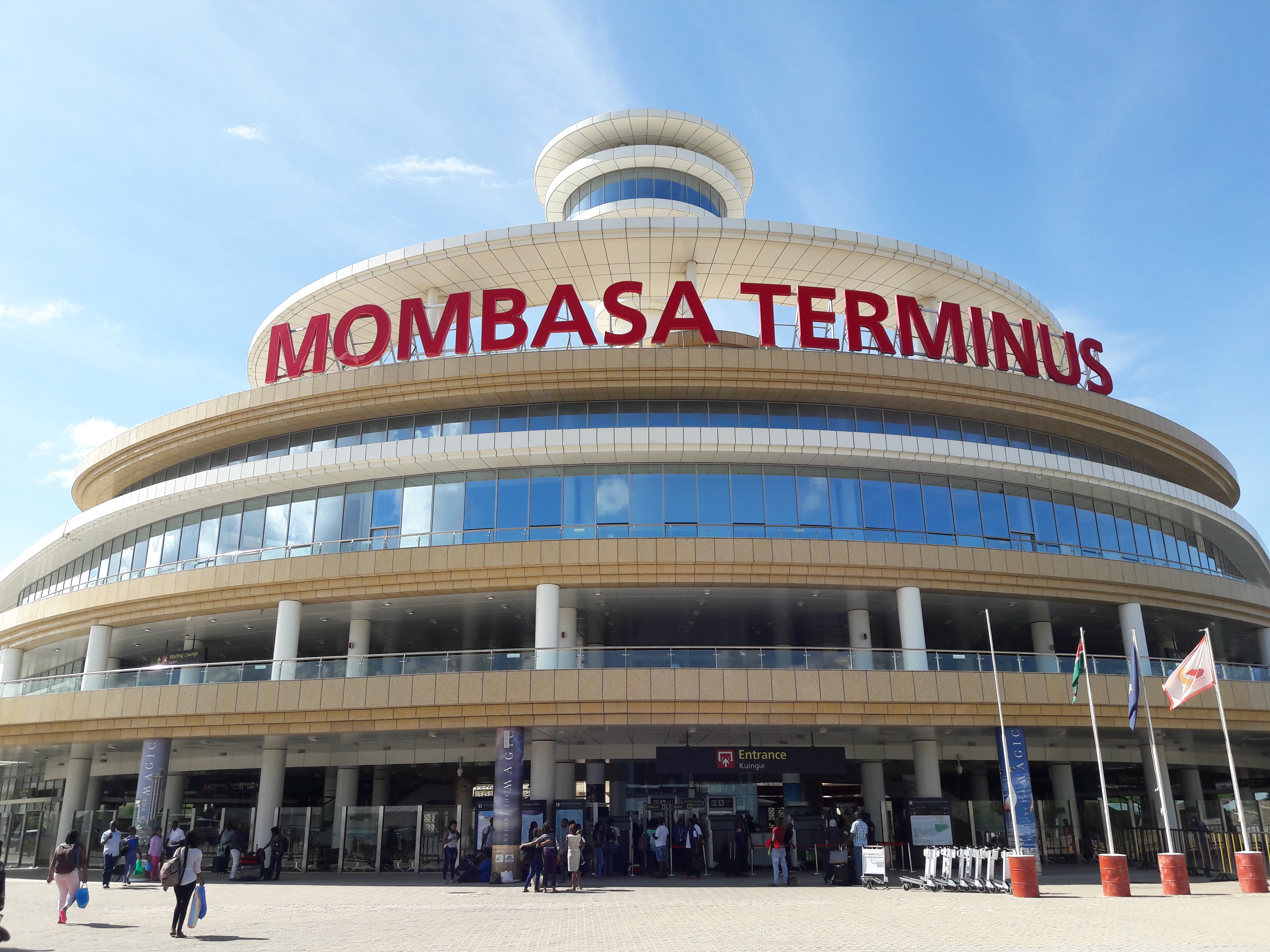
Mombasa Terminus

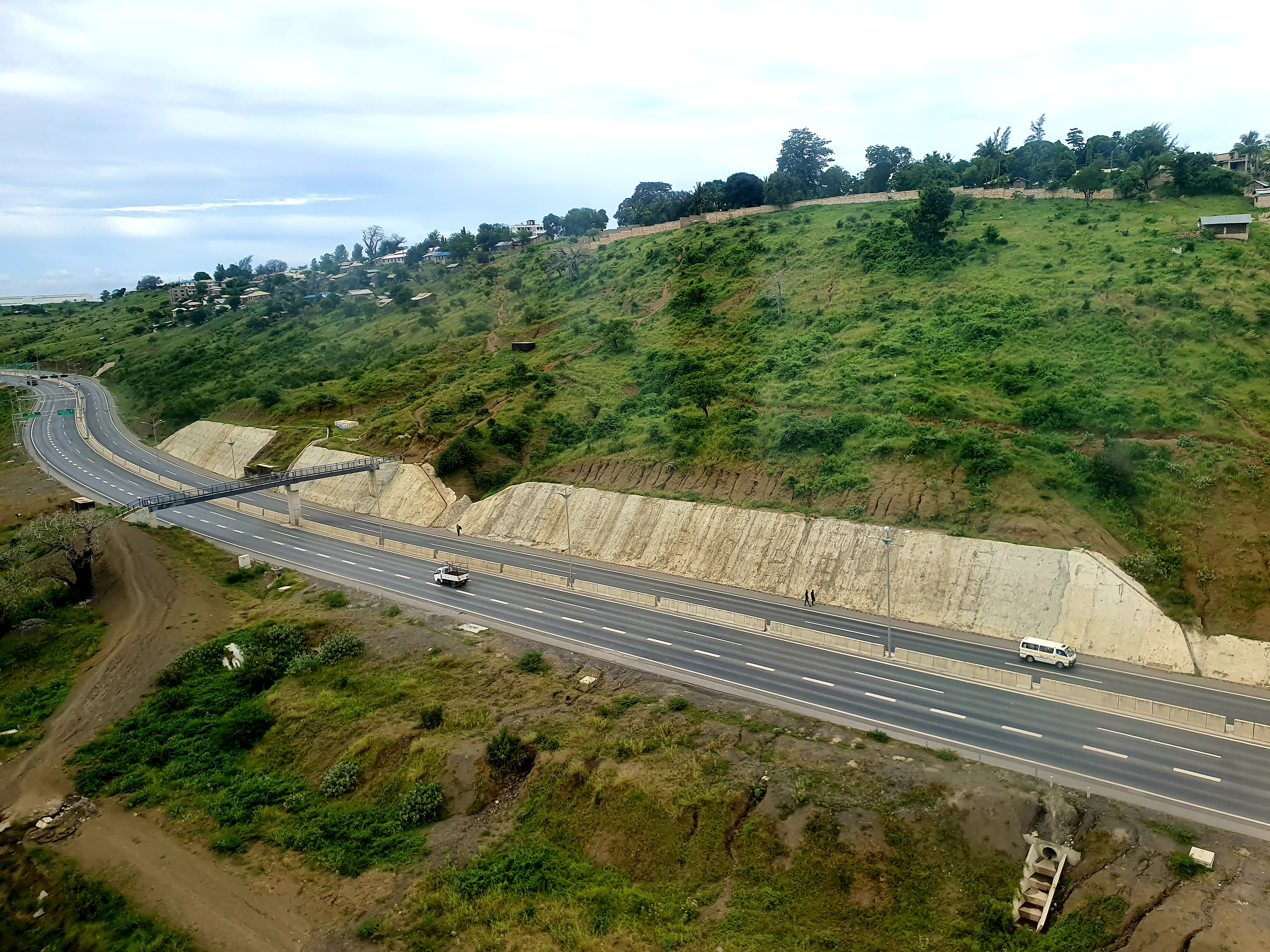
Nairobi-Mombasa Highway

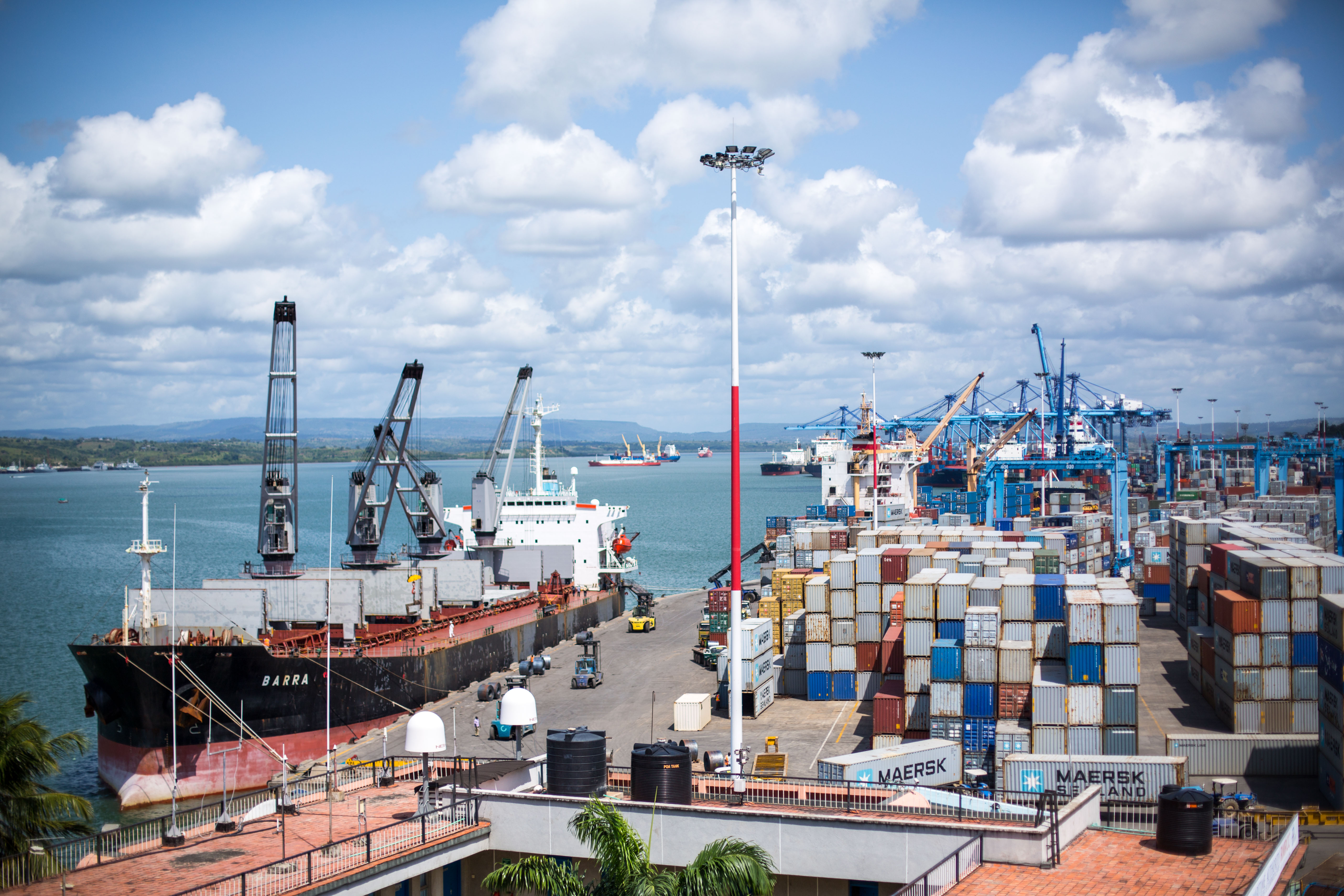
Mombasa port

=== Rail ===
Mombasa has a modern railway station on the Mombasa–Nairobi Standard Gauge Railway that replaced the narrow-gauge Uganda Railway completed in 1901 under British colonial rule. Completed in 2017 and located at Miritini, the Mombasa Terminus station links Mombasa to Nairobi. The station, situated about 20 kilometres from the city centre, is accessible through the newly built (2018) highway, being the first phase of the Dongo Kundu bypass. Kenya Railways transports passengers and cargo through the Standard Gauge Railway between Nairobi to Mombasa.

=== Road ===
Driving in Mombasa is straightforward and the majority of the roads are tarmacked. The Mombasa–Nairobi Expressway connects Mombasa to the capital city Nairobi.

Within Mombasa, most local people use matatus (mini-buses) which are extremely common in Kenya, to move around the city and its suburbs. The tuk-tuk—a motor vehicle with three wheels—is widely used as transport around the city and its suburbs. No more than three passengers may be carried. A boda-boda is originally a bicycle taxi but have long since been replaced by motorcycles.

=== Sea ===
The port of Mombasa is the largest in East Africa, with 19 deep water berths with two additional berths nearing completion and two oil terminals. The port is connected by rail and road to the interior. At present there is little or no scheduled passenger service from the port, however, international cruise ships frequent the port. The port is part of the 21st Century Maritime Silk Road that runs from the Chinese coast to the Upper Adriatic region. In connection with the Silk Road Initiative, China has started infrastructure development projects in Kenya and is building roads, railways and public buildings on credit.

==== Ferry ====
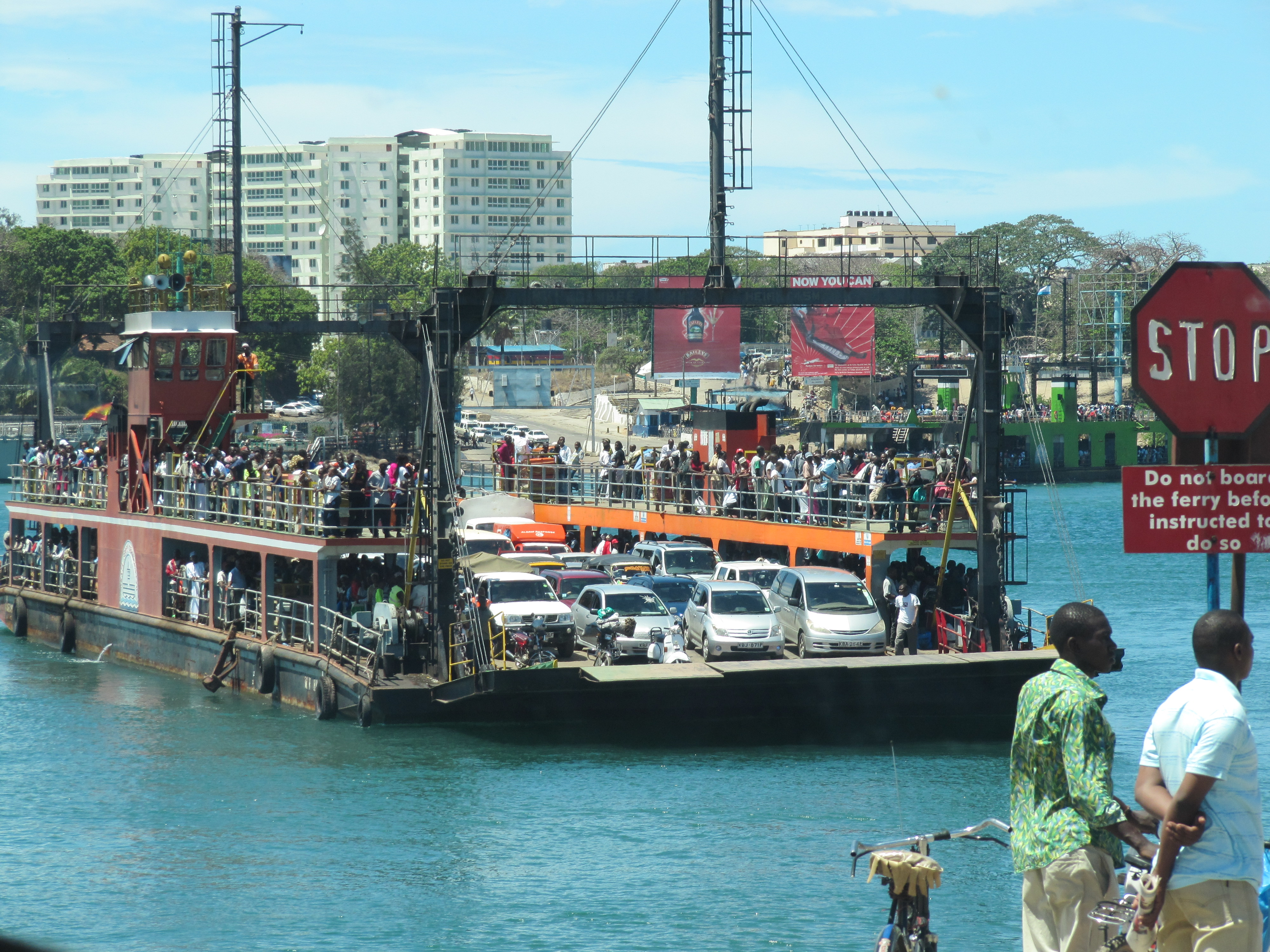
Mombasa ferry

There is no bridge between Mombasa Island and the south coast, instead the route is served by ferries operated by the Kenya Ferry Service from Kilindini and Mtongwe to Likoni in the south coast of Mombasa. The last major accident occurred in 1994 when a ferry serving Mtongwe route sank killing more than 270 people.

As a result of the increase in more luxurious hotels along the south coast and a lack of a direct bridge linking with Mombasa island, visiting tourists have the option of flying directly from Nairobi into the South Coast airstrip at Ukunda.

The Dongo Kundu Bypass Highway is under construction (as at 2018). With a total of three bridges, it will finally connect the mainland to the south coast easing the burden on the ferry services. Mombasa Gate Bridge will connect the mainland to Likoni, this will eliminate the usage of the unsafe ferry which has claimed hundreds of lives.

== Education ==
The major university in the island is the Technical University of Mombasa. The city has a campus of Kenyatta University. Other major university campuses include University of Nairobi-Mombasa campus, Mount Kenya University-Mombasa campus, JKUAT-Mombasa, Shanzu Teachers Training College, Mombasa Technical College, Bandari college, Utalii college, and ICS college Mombasa.

International schools which provide International curricula, normally practice the IGCSE system (English curriculum), The Islamic curriculum and the IB curriculum (International Baccalaureate) such as:

- Aga Khan Academy - IB
- Mombasa Academy - IGCSE
- Coast Academy - IGCSE
- Oshwal Academy - IGCSE
- Light Academy - IGCSE
- Braeburn Mombasa International School - IGCSE. Braeburn Mombasa International School, one of the Braeburn Schools, is a co-educational, multi-cultural, international weekly boarding school teaching the English National Curriculum from nursery to A-Level (2–18 years).
- Other notable International schools include: Bright Academy, Deenway Academy, Shree Swaminarayan Academy, MM Shah and MV Shah Academy, Jaffery Academy, Mombasa Noble Centre, and Greenwood Grove International school.

All these schools are English based and they provide the same curriculum as either English, Islamic or IB which are recognised internationally. There are in 12 International Schools in Mombasa.

The last exam paper of year 12 or 13 which is highschool, comes from either the Middle East, USA or England depending on the system they follow.

=== Additional schools ===
- KenCada Academy; This is a school on Mombasa's mainland area of Bamburi, and practices a mixed curriculum which consists of the Kenyan curriculum, CBC and the Canadian curriculum. If counted KenCada brings the list of total International schools in Mombasa to 13.
- HOFACE INTERNATIONAL AUTISM SCHOOL NYALI; This is an international school located on Mombasa's mainland coast of Nyali, and specializes in teaching autistic children.
- Lifegate School; This is an International located on Mombasa's mainland coast of Nyali, and specializes in practicing the Accelerated Christian Education Curriculum (ACE).

== Healthcare ==
Public health services in Mombasa are run by the Mombasa County Department of Health, which took over the city's public facilities when health services were devolved to Kenya's county governments in 2013. The county organises its public facilities in tiers, with a sub-county hospital in each sub-county, including Port Reitz, Tudor and Likoni sub-county hospitals.

The largest hospital in the city and in the Kenyan coast region is the Coast General Teaching and Referral Hospital, a Level 5 county referral hospital founded in 1908 with a capacity of 723 beds. It serves patients referred from the neighbouring counties of Kwale, Kilifi, Lamu, Tana River and Taita Taveta, and in 2026 the county health executive described it as the second-largest referral facility in Kenya, with more than 400 nurses and over 100 consultants. Its funding has been contested since devolution: the hospital's monthly operating cost of about KSh 150 million exceeded the county's health allocation, and successive county administrations have asked the national government to reclassify it as a Level 6 national referral hospital, a move the national government has resisted under the Health Act 2017, which keeps Level 5 hospitals under county management. The hospital is a clinical training site for medical training colleges in the city, including the Mombasa campus of the Kenya Medical Training College, which is located next to it, and it hosts observational placements for international pre-health and health-professions students.

Private hospitals in the city include the Mombasa Hospital, the Aga Khan Hospital, Mombasa, Pandya Memorial Hospital and Premier Hospital; the county also lists about fifteen smaller private hospitals, four nursing homes and nine health clinics. The Aga Khan Hospital, an 82-bed facility established in 1944, is part of the Aga Khan Health Services network in East Africa.

Mombasa has one of the higher HIV prevalence rates among Kenyan counties: the Kenya HIV Estimates 2022 put adult prevalence at 4.6 percent, against a national figure of 3.7 percent. The city has experienced recurrent dengue fever outbreaks. An outbreak in 2013–2014 was investigated by Kenyan and United States public health researchers, who estimated that about 13 percent of residents of the Tudor area had been infected. A further outbreak was declared in March 2021. County vector-control surveys have identified discarded vehicle tyres as a major mosquito breeding site in the city.

In 2026 the county government launched a programme, branded Mombasa Care, under which it pays Social Health Authority contributions for the city's poorest residents and abolished user fees for children under five at public hospitals.

== Places of worship ==
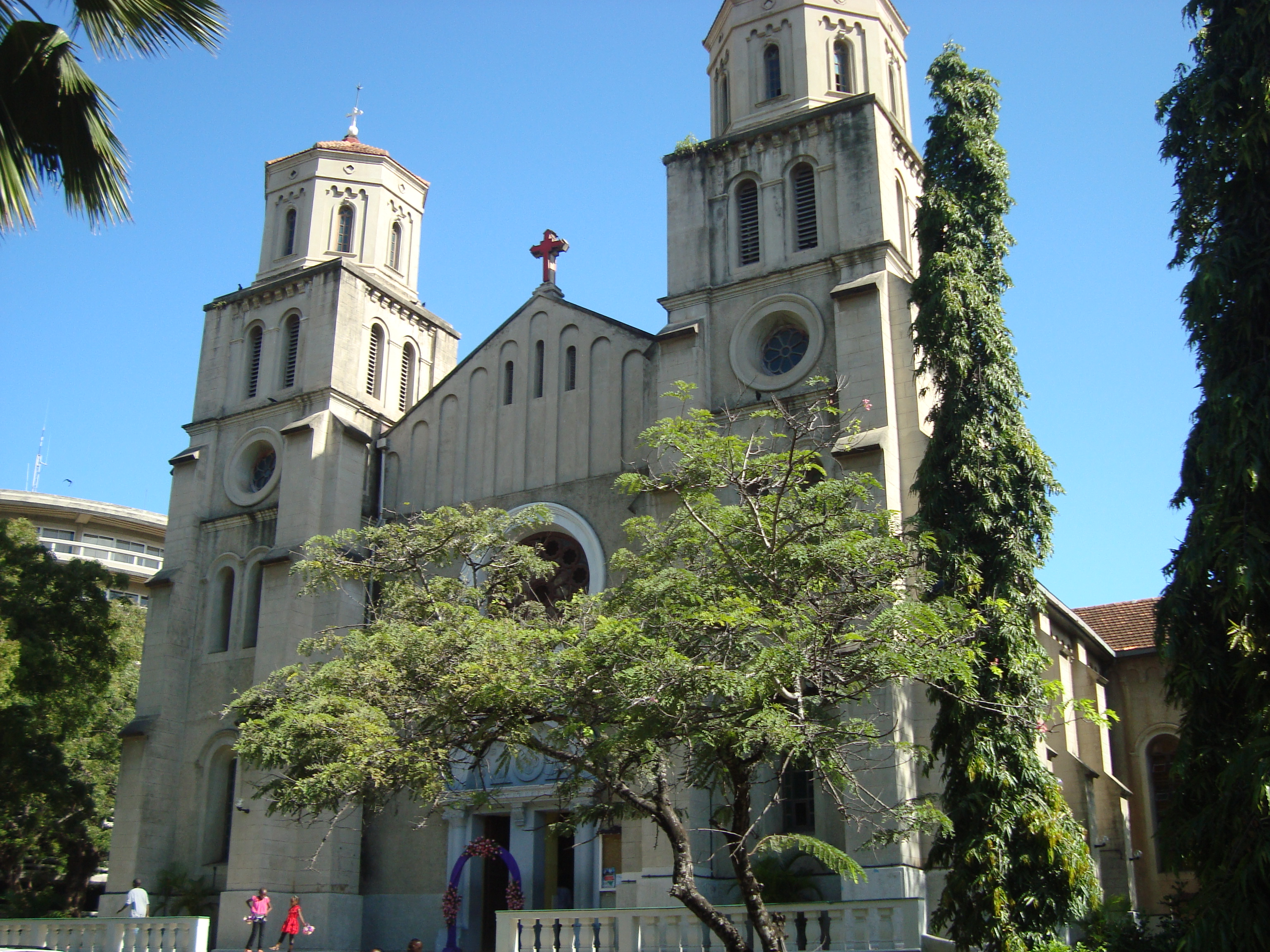
Holy Ghost Cathedral, Roman Catholic Archdiocese of Mombasa

Lord Shiva Temple in Mombasa, Hindu Union of Mombasa

Mombasa has places of worship serving the needs of the city's diverse communities including mosques, churches and Hindu temples.

Mosques represented in the city include:

- Masjid Sakina
- Masjid Nur
- Shibu Mosque
- Sheikh Jundan Mosque
- Masjid Baluchi
- Masjid Mandhry
- Konzi Mosque
- Masjid Basheikh

Christian denominations represented in the city include the following:

- Roman Catholic Archdiocese of Mombasa with Holy Ghost Cathedral, Mombasa as the main church
- Anglican Church of Kenya (Anglican Communion), with Mombasa Anglican Cathedral Church as the main church
- Presbyterian Church of East Africa
- (World Communion of Reformed Churches),
- Baptist Convention of Kenya (Baptist World Alliance),
- Assemblies of God.
- Jehovah's Witnesses, With congregations based in Makupa, Bamburi and Likoni.

Hindu Temples in Mombasa include:

- Hindu Union of Mombasa - Shivalaay (Makadara)
- Hindu Union of Mombasa - Gombeshwar (Nyali)
- Shree Ganesha Temple - Nyali
- Shree Ramdev Pir Temple - Nyali
- Shree Dwarikadham Hare Krishna Temple (ISKON) - Nyali
- Shree BAPS Swaminarayan Temple - Mombasa Mainland
- Shree Gayatri Brahm Samaj Temple - Mombasa Mainland
- Shree Cutch Satsang Swaminarayan Temple - Mombasa Mainland
- Shree Radhe-Krishna Makupa Temple - Mombasa Mainland
- Shree Vishwakarma Temple - Mombasa Mainland

Many Hindus visit Mombasa to pray at a number of naturally formed Lingam that have formed in the Nyali beach Gombeshwar Caves. According to local folklore, the cave-temple was found a long time ago when a group of local herders were puzzled after they noticed that one of their cows regularly released all of her milk at a specific yet random spot on the hills. They are then said to have approached some Hindu families living in the area to ask if they had any idea about the strange behaviour of the cow. The group then teamed up, made their way to the spot and started digging. They thus encountered the cave where they found a 'Shiva Lingam' – an abstract representation of the Hindu God Lord Shiva, whose vehicle is Nandi (mythology). Hindus worship Lord Shiva by offering milk to a Lingam.

Other places of worship within Mombasa include the Sikh Shree Guru Gobind Singh Sabha Temple and the Shree Parshva Vallabh Jain Temple.

== Culture ==
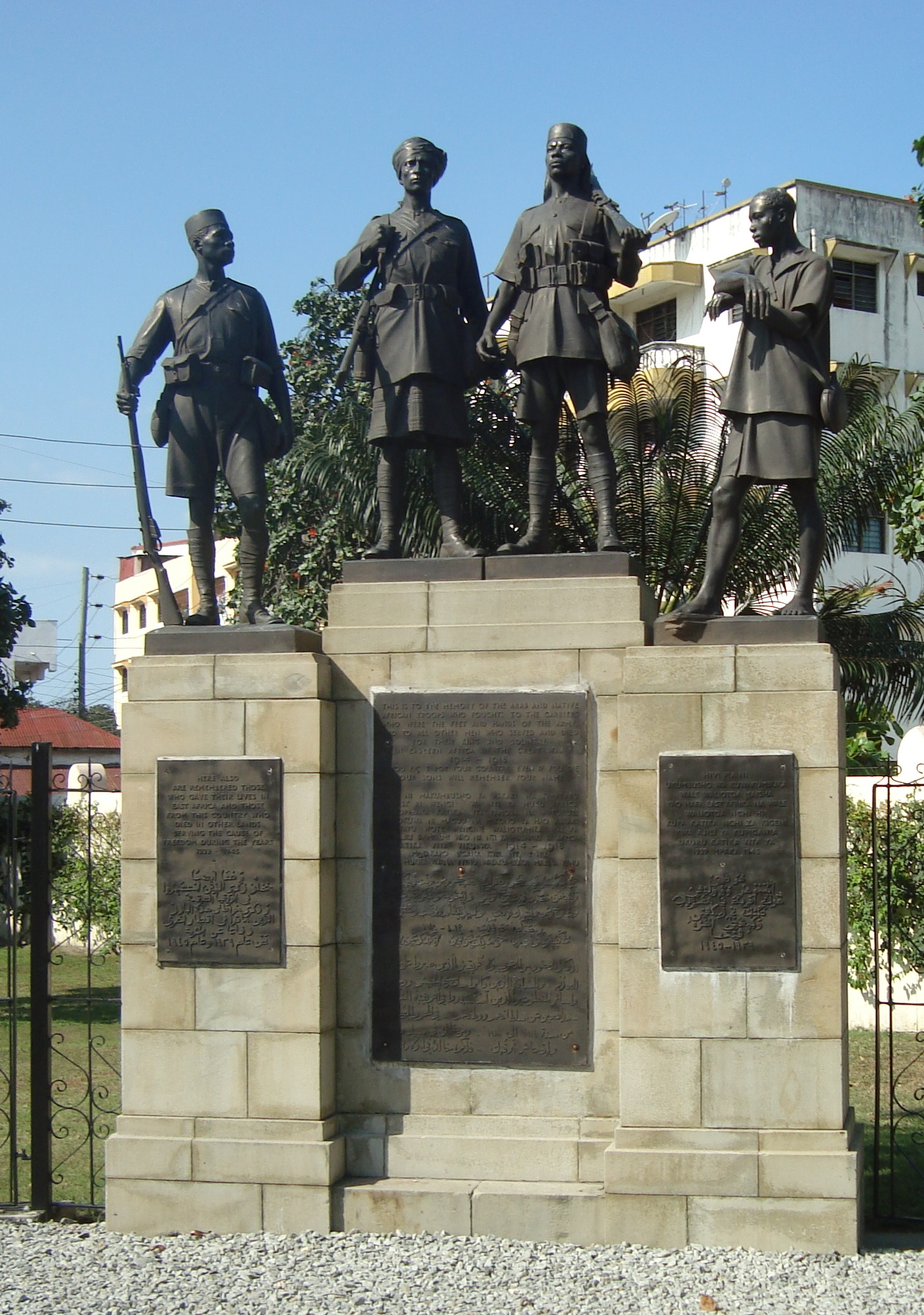
Askari monument Mombasa

A major cultural hub in Kenya and the African Great Lakes, Mombasa's proximity to Zanzibar, Nairobi and the Indian subcontinent, as well as its large shipping and maritime industries gives it a diverse mosaic of cultures. Music is a main feature of Mombasa's culture.

=== Music ===
Taarab music, which originates from Zanzibar, has a prominent local presence. Styles of music native to Mombasa include the smooth and mellow Bango, fast-paced Chakacha and traditional Mwanzele.

Musicians of note are Mombasa Roots, Safari Sounds, and Them Mushrooms. Mombasa has been the home or base for former greats such as Fundi Konde, known for his song "Tausi"; Fadhili Williams and Nyota Ndogo.

Recently, hip hop, reggae, soul, blues, salsa and (among the Indian community) bhangra have become popular, especially amongst the youth. Mombasa is mainly a tourism centre with hundreds of entertainment spots of all kinds including night clubs, bars, hotels, and fancy restaurants.

=== Sports ===
Mombasa is represented in the Kenyan Premier League by Bandari F.C., which plays at the Mbaraki Sports Grounds. Also, the Congo United FC, Promoted and dropped in 2011, are in the second tier Nationwide Super League with 4 other hometown clubs – Admiral F.C.; Magongo Rangers; Sparki Youth and Coast United. Derbies between Mombasa teams have become intriguing affairs recently. Another team, Coast Stars, were relegated several years ago from the league. The only Mombasa-based team to win the league is Feisal F.C., the 1965 champions. Kiziwi leopards was a popular team in the 1980s as was Mombasa Wanderers decades before. There are several cricket teams in Mombasa; one is Mombasa Sports Club (MSC), whose ground was given ODI status in 2006. MSC has also a rugby union team playing in the Kenya Cup League, the premier rugby competition in Kenya. Mvita XI men and MSC ladies represent Mombasa in Kenyan field hockey leagues.

Mombasa is represented in the nationwide rugby league by Mombasa RFC. The city is also host to a leg of the national rugby sevens circuit, being one of only six city hosts. The Mombasa leg is referred to as the Driftwood sevens, and the annual tournament is extremely popular, attracting thousands of fans from across the country.

The 2007 World Cross Country Championships were held in Mombasa. Mombasa Marathon is competed annually in Mombasa. The town also hosts the biennial classic edition of Safari Rally and annually a Kenya National Rally Championship round.

Scuba diving takes place mostly within the Mombasa Marine National Park and Reserve, which is managed and maintained by Kenya Wildlife Service. The park has a length of about 8 km (5.0 mi).

== Twin towns – sister cities ==
Mombasa is twinned with:

- Durban, South Africa (2012)
- Guangzhou, China (2018)
- Honolulu, United States (2008)
- Long Beach, United States (2007)
- Seattle, United States (1981)

== Notable people ==
During its history, Mombasa was visited by numerous pioneers of the maritime exploration, such as the Arabs Al Idrissi (1151) and Ibn Battuta (1330) or the Portuguese Vasco da Gama (1498), Pedro Álvares Cabral (1500) João da Nova (1505) and Afonso de Albuquerque (1507).

- Abdilatif Abdalla, writer, university professor and political protestor
- Karen Blixen, Danish novelist
- Mercedes Iman Diamond, drag queen and contestant on the eleventh season of RuPaul's Drag Race
- Timothy R. McClanahan, marine ecologist who lived and has worked in Mombasa since 1991
- Swaleh Nguru, Arab businessman, conservationist and philanthropist
- Thomas Risley Odhiambo, entomologist
- Ayub Ogada, musician, singer and composer known for having composed two songs for the movie The Constant Gardener
- Rodgers Okumu, footballer
- Fadhili William, musician, singer, and composer

== Gallery ==
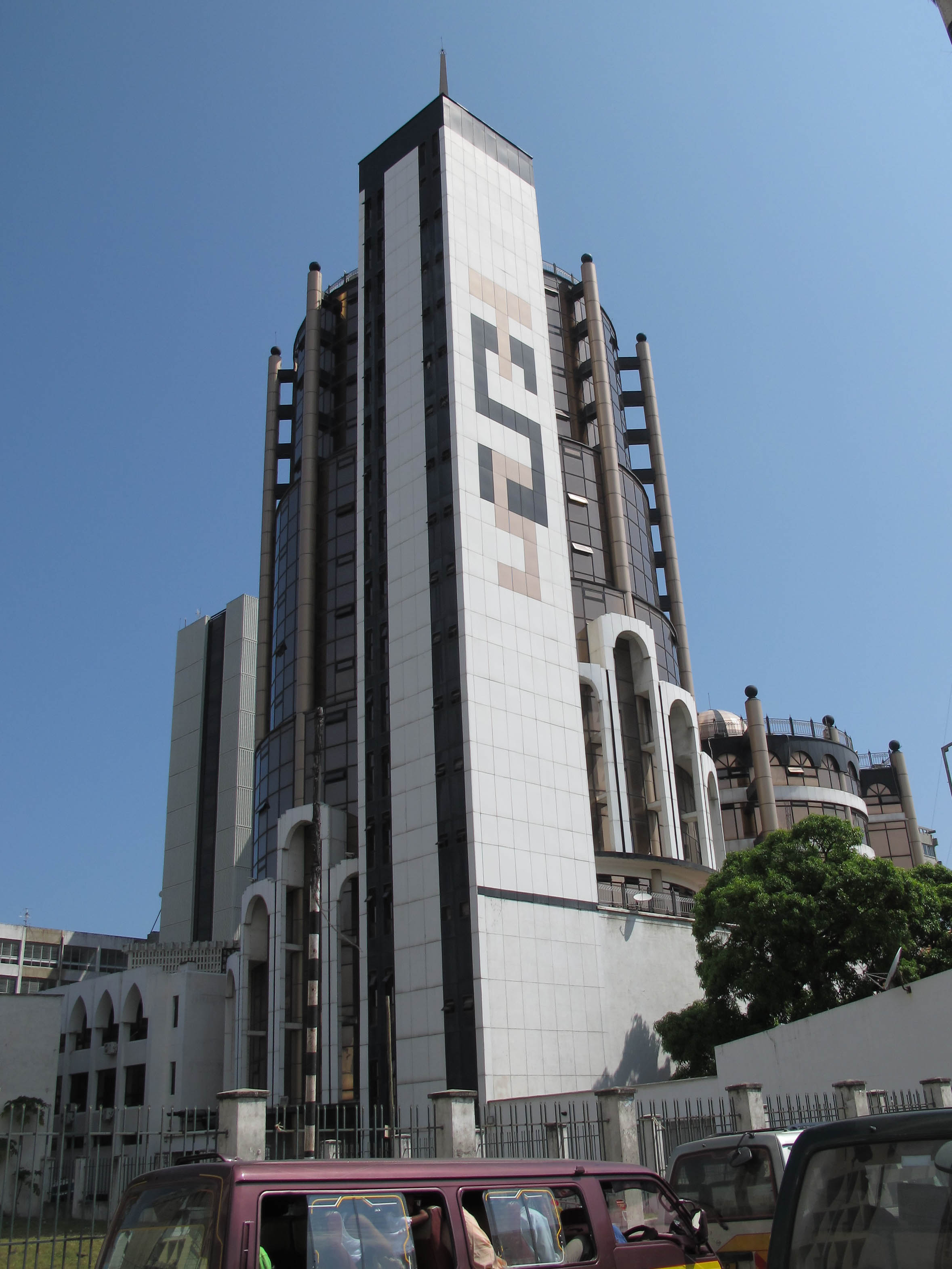
Mombasa CBD Building

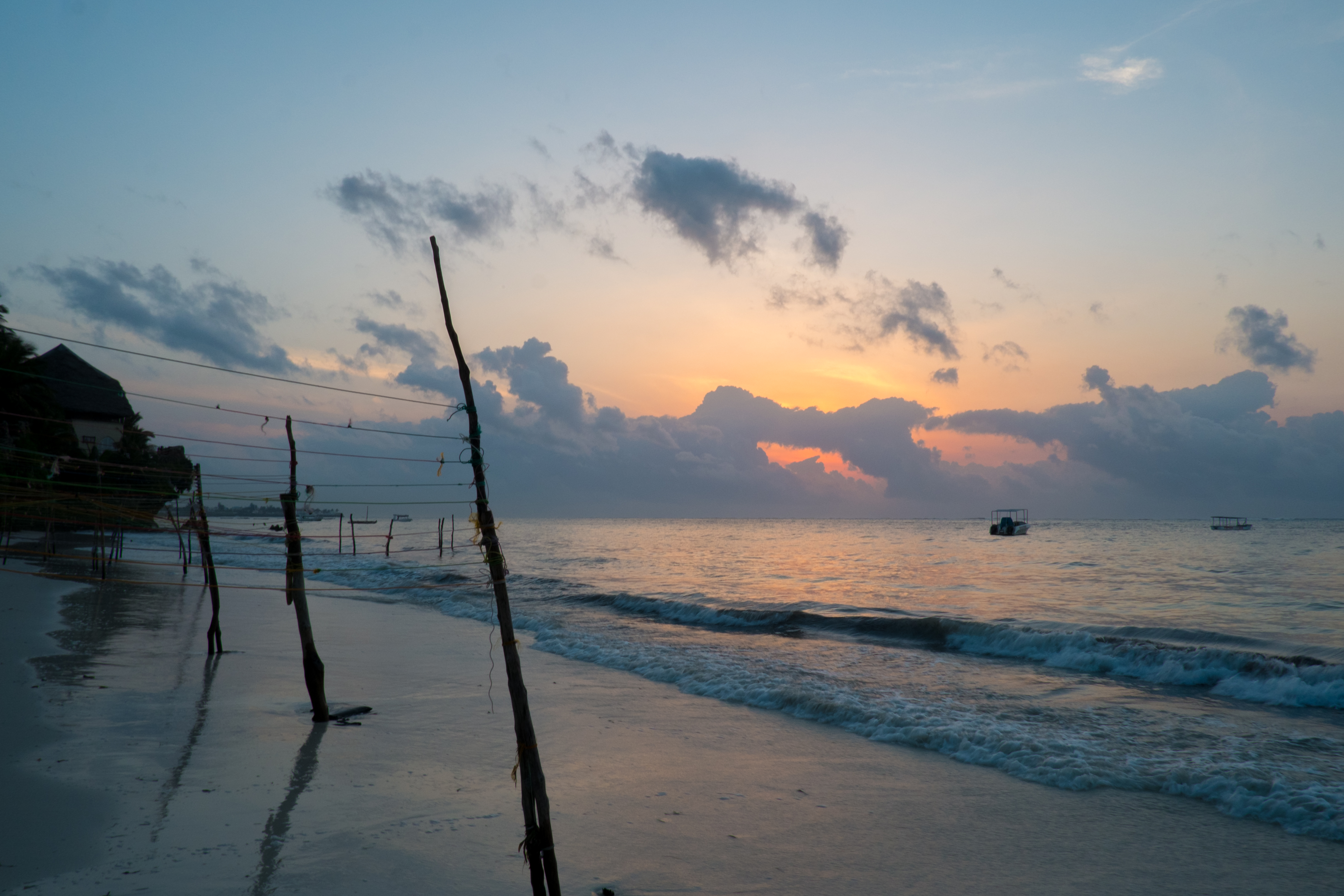
Mombasa beach sunrise

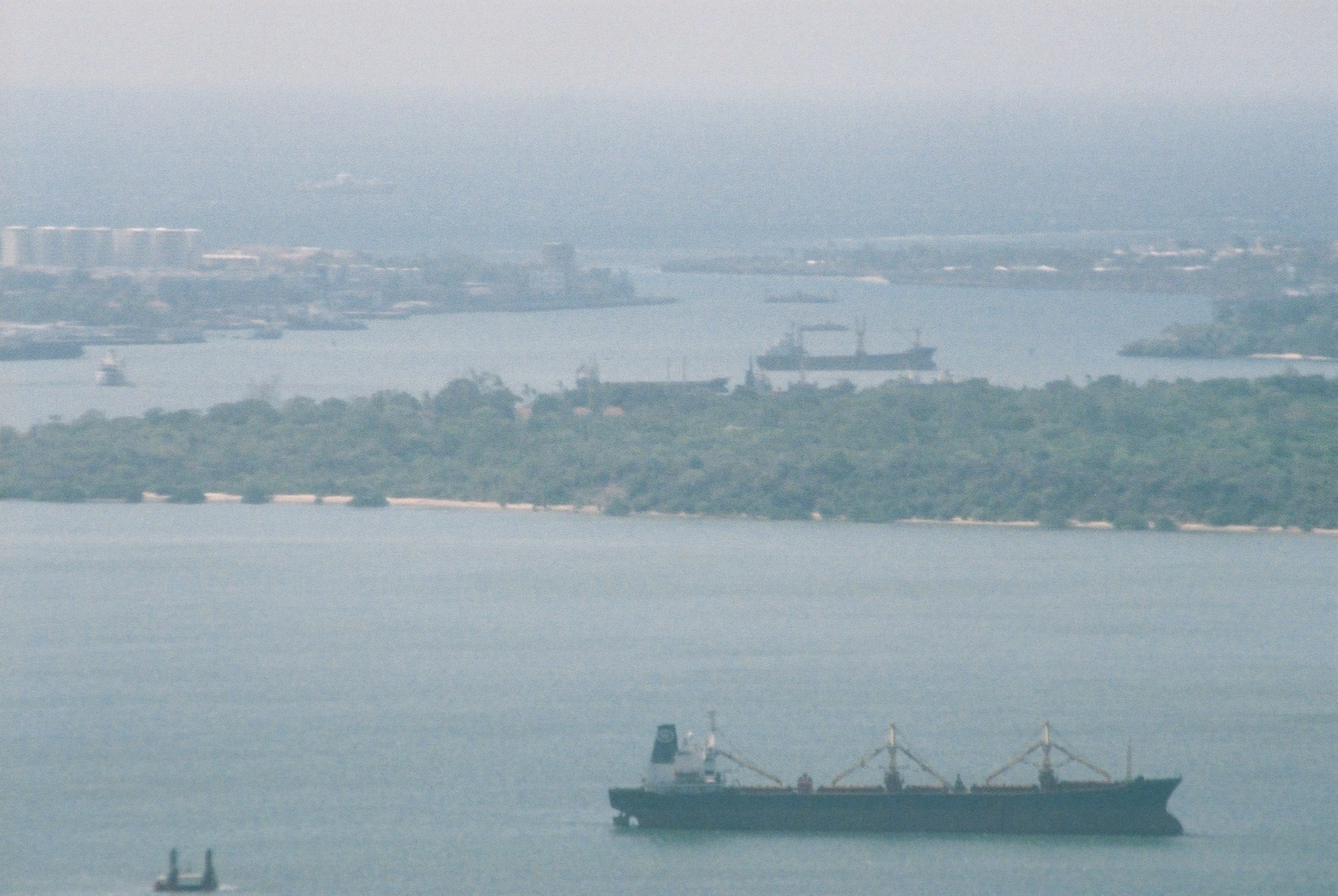
Port of Mombasa

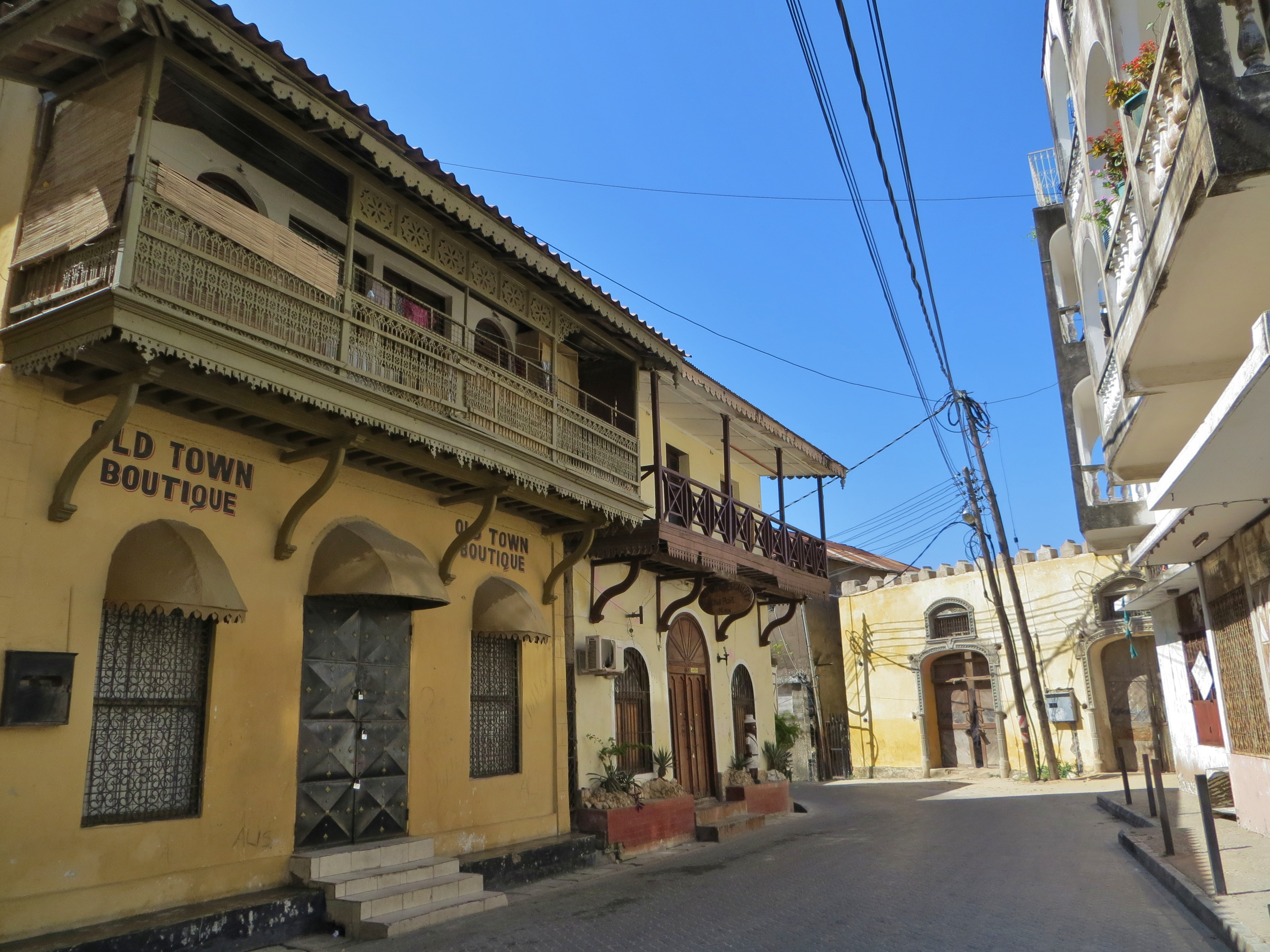
View of the old town

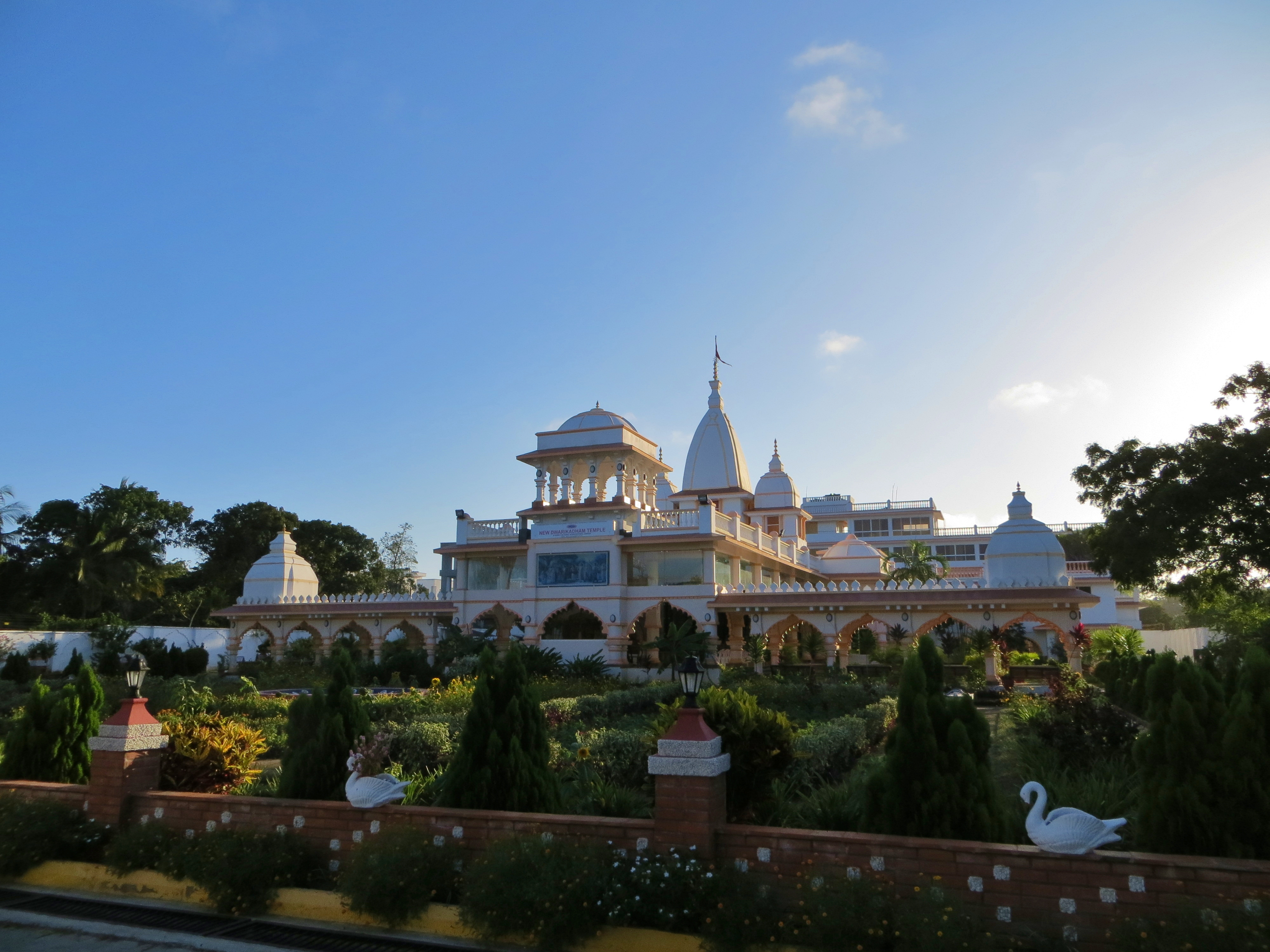
New Dwarikadham Hindu temple in Nyali

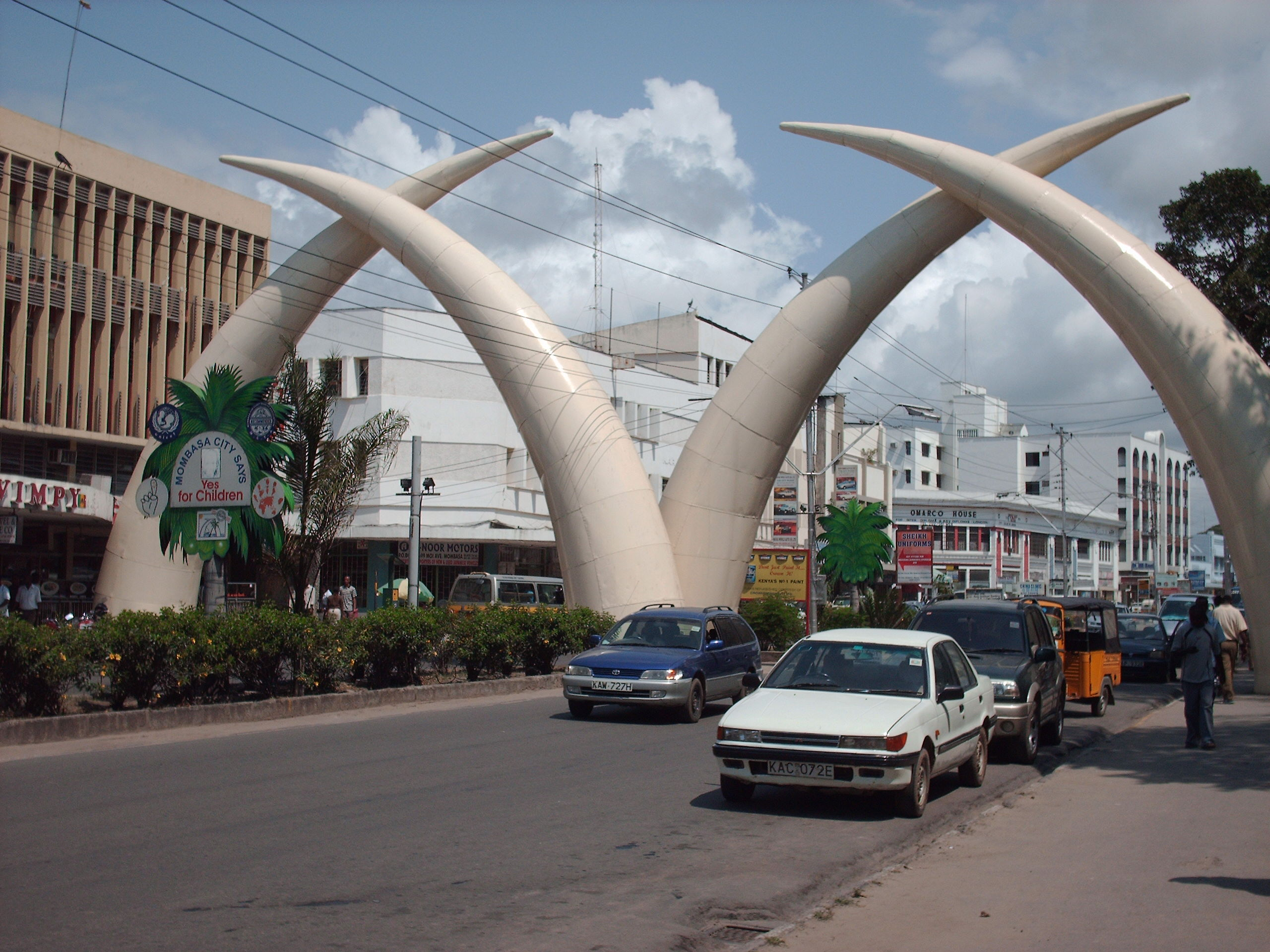
The Mombasa tusks, on Moi Avenue

== In popular culture ==
- Mombasa is the subject of the popular song and music video of the same name, "Mombasa" by Jabali Afrika feat. Jason Dunford aka Samaki Mkuu released on July 17, 2020.
- In the film Out of Africa, Mombasa is the train destination as the seaport for voyages to Europe via the Suez Canal, and Mombasa is indicated as downriver ("This water must go home to Mombasa").
- Mombasa is featured in Paul Schrader's 2014 film Dying of the Light as the hiding place of terrorist Muhammad Banir. It is also a prominent setting in Schrader's 2017 re-cut version, Dark.
- A futuristic Mombasa is a pivotal setting in the popular Halo franchise, with much of Halo 2, Halo 3, and all of Halo 3: ODST taking place in the city. The games are set in the year 2552 and Mombasa serves as the capital of the fictional East African Protectorate. The city is a megalopolis divided into "Old Mombasa" and "New Mombasa", filled with immense skyscrapers and an orbital elevator. New Mombasa is the main battleground of the Covenant's invasion of Earth, as they focus their campaign in and around the city in search of a massive, technologically advanced Forerunner artifact buried nearby. Old Mombasa is largely destroyed by "glassing" (bombarded by plasma until melted) during the battle and excavation process; it likely is glassed again shortly after (along with much of modern-day Kenya and Tanzania) during the events of Halo 3. Reconstruction efforts begin at some point after Halo 3. More recently, New Mombasa has appeared as the setting of the Halo Infinite multiplayer maps "Bazaar" and "Streets".
- Mombasa is featured in the 2010 movie, Inception, where Cobb meets Eames and Yusuf before the job takes place.
- In the Warren Zevon song "Roland the Headless Thompson Gunner", Mombasa is one of the key locales related to the protagonist's quest.
- The Finnish pop hit "Mombasa" (by Taiska) is about the city.
- In the US, the Walt Disney World resort recreated a Kenyan village in the Africa section of the Disney's Animal Kingdom theme park named "Harambe", which is modelled after Mombasa. The village features a store called the "Mombasa Marketplace".
- In the Indian movie Mr. India, Mombasa is mentioned in the popular song "Hawa Hawaii".
- The Indian Bollywood movie Company was shot partly in Mombasa.
- Most of the events in the 2017 story "Consummation in Mombasa" (by Andrei Gusev) take place in Mombasa and in the nearest district Mtwapa.
- One-Way Ticket to Mombasa (Menolippu Mombasaan) is a 2002 Finnish film directed by Hannu Tuomainen.
- Popular blackgaze band Deafheaven titled the last song of its 2021 album, Infinite Granite, with the name of the city. The lyrics make reference to the beaches and general uplifting scenery of Mombasa.
- In The Thief and the Cobbler, Richard Williams' unfinished movie, the antagonist Zigzag brings King Nod "a plaything from far south of Gaza, a bountiful maiden from Mombasa" at the beginning of the film.

== See also ==
- Ngomongo Villages
