= Timeline of Mombasa =

The following is a timeline of the history of the city of Mombasa, Coast Province, Kenya.

== 14th-18th centuries ==
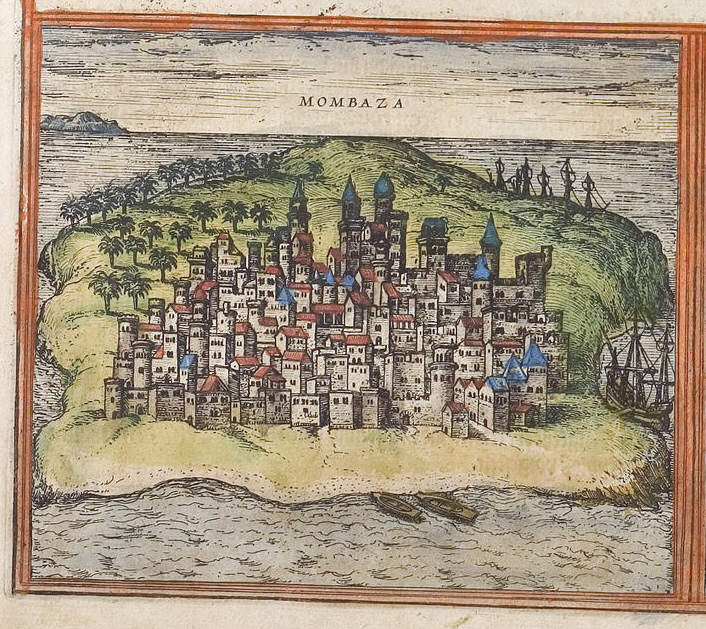
Mombaza, 16th century

- 1331 - Ibn Battuta, a Moroccan traveler, visits Mombasa.
- 1498 - 8 April: Vasco da Gama anchors in port.
- 1505 - Town sacked by Portuguese forces of Francisco de Almeida.
- 1507 - Mandhry Mosque built.
- 1528 - Town sacked by Portuguese forces of Nuno da Cunha.
- 1529 - Portuguese in power.
- 1588 - Town captured by Amir Ali Bey.
- 1593 - Town under rule of Malindi.
- 1594 - Fort Jesus built by Portuguese.
- 1597 - Augustinian mission initiated.
- 1631 - Portuguese "expelled." The sultan of Mombasa, christened Dom Jerónimo Chingulia, assassinated the Portuguese governor, reclaimed his Muslim name of Yusuf ibn al-Hasan, and ordered all Christians in the city to convert to Islam.
- 1632 - Town besieged by Portuguese forces.
- 1635 - Fort Jesus repaired by Francisco de Seixas e Cabreira.
- 1661 - Town sacked by Omani forces.
- 1696 - Siege of Fort Jesus by Omani forces.
- 1698 - Sultanate of Oman in power.
- 1728/9 - A Portuguese force from Goa again held Mombasa, but were driven out by the Muscat Arabs.
- 1734 - Mazrui in power.

== 19th century ==
- 1837 - Said bin Sultan, Sultan of Muscat and Oman in power.
- 1875 - A revolt against Zanzibar was put down with British assistance.
- 1885 - Hinduism in Africa Formation of the Hindu Union, and creation of Lord Shiva Temple (Shivaalay) in Central Mombasa.
- 1887 - Mombasa "leased to the British East Africa Company;" town becomes capital of British East Africa Protectorate.
- 1895 - Government Press established.
- 1896
  - Kilindini Harbour inaugurated.
  - National Bank of India branch and Mombasa Club established.
- 1897 - Population on island: 15,000-20,000 (estimate).
- 1899 - Post office built.

== 20th century ==
- 1901
  - Uganda Railway (Kisumu-Mombasa) begins operating.
  - African Standard newspaper begins publication.
  - Jevanjee mosque built.
- 1902 - Court of Kenya established.
- 1903 - Seif Bin Salim public library founded.
- 1904 - Africa Hotel in business.
- 1905
  - Mombasa Cathedral opens.
  - Court of Kenya relocated from Mombasa to Nairobi.
- 1907 - Slavery abolished.
- 1910 - Population: about 30,000.
- 1920 - Town becomes part of British Protectorate of Kenya.
- 1927 - Kenya Daily Mail newspaper begins publication.
- 1929 - Makupa Causeway built.
- 1931 - Nyali Bridge built.
- 1937 - Likoni Ferry begins operating.
- 1944 - Aga Khan Hospital, Mombasa established.
- 1951 - Mombasa Institute of Muslim Education opens.
- 1955 - Roman Catholic Diocese of Mombasa and Zanzibar established.
- 1958 - Oceanic Hotel built.
- 1962 - Population: 179,575 urban agglomeration.
- 1962 - 1963 David Kayanda becomes the first African Mayor of Mombasa.
  - Msanifu Kombo becomes mayor.
  - Town becomes part of Republic of Kenya.
- 1973
  - 27 April: MV Globe Star ship runs aground near Mombasa.
  - Population: 301,000 urban agglomeration.
- 1979 - Moi International Airport expanded.
- 1980 - New Nyali Bridge built.
- 1981
  - Mombasa Records Centre of the Kenya National Archives established.
  - Sister city relationship established with Seattle, US.
- 1984 - New Burhani Mosque built.
- 1985 - Mombasa Marathon begins.
- 1986 - Marine Park established.
- 1990 - Population: 476,000 (urban agglomeration).
- 1998 - Najib Balala becomes mayor.
- 1999
  - Mombasa Republican Council formed.
  - Coast Gymkhana Club Ground in use.
- 2000 - Population: 687,000 (urban agglomeration).

== 21st century ==
- 2002 - 28 November: 2002 Mombasa attacks.
- 2003 - Aga Khan Academy, Mombasa established in Kilindini.
- 2005 - Population: 830,000 (urban agglomeration).
- 2007 - Mombasa Polytechnic University College established.
- 2009
  - Ahmed Mohdhar elected mayor.
  - Population: 523,183.
- 2010 - Population: 905,627 (estimate).
- 2012
  - 15 May: Grenade attack in Bella Vista nightclub.
  - 27 August: Cleric Aboud Rogo killed; unrest ensues.
- 2013
  - October: Cleric Sheikh Ibrahim killed; unrest ensues.
  - Mombasa polytechnic university college was promoted to a fully developed university now known as Technical University of Mombasa.
- 2017 - Mombasa–Nairobi Standard Gauge Railway begins operating.

== See also ==
- Mombasa history (fr)
- Mombasa District
- Timelines of other cities in Kenya: Nairobi

== Bibliography ==
Published in 19th century

- Jedidiah Morse; Richard C. Morse (1823), "Mombaca", A New Universal Gazetteer (4th ed.), New Haven: S. Converse
- Algernon F.R. de Horsey (1897), "(Mombasa)", Africa Pilot (6th ed.), London: Great Britain. Admiralty

Published in 20th century

- "Mombassa". Meyers Grosses Konversations-Lexikon (in German). Leipzig. 1906. hdl:2027/njp.32101064063199.
- "Mombasa" . Encyclopædia Britannica. Vol. 18 (11th ed.). 1910. pp. 682–683.
- Frederick Treves (1910), "Mombasa", Uganda for a holiday, London: Smith, Elder & Co., OCLC 33285047
- "Mombasa". The Red Book 1922-23: Handbook and Directory for Kenya Colony and Protectorate, Uganda Protectorate, Tanganyika Territory, and Zanzibar Sultanate. Nairobi: East Africa Standard Ltd. 1922. hdl:2027/inu.30000125593750.
- John Milner Gray (1957), The British in Mombasa, 1824-1826, London: Macmillan, OCLC 2629449
- C.R. Boxer (1960), Fort Jesus and the Portuguese in Mombasa, 1593-1729, London: Hollis & Carter, OCLC 939150
- Irene S. van Dongen (1963). "Mombasa in the Land and Sea Exchanges of East Africa". Erdkunde. 17: 2. Bibcode:1963Erdk...17a...2V. doi:10.3112/erdkunde.1963.01.02.
- F.J. Berg (1968). "The Swahili Community of Mombasa, 1500-1900". Journal of African History. 9: 35–56. doi:10.1017/S0021853700008343. S2CID 162622809.
- Harm J. De Blij (1968), Mombasa: an African city, Evanston, Illinois: Northwestern University Press
- Richard Stren (1970). "Factional Politics and Central Control in Mombasa, 1960-1969". Canadian Journal of African Studies. 4 (1): 33–56. doi:10.2307/483741. JSTOR 483741.
- Hyder Kindy (1972). Life and Politics in Mombasa.
- G.S.P. Freeman-Grenville, ed. (1975), "History of Mombasa", The East African Coast: Select Documents (2nd ed.), London: Collings, ISBN 0901720852
- Margaret Strobel (1975). "Women's Wedding Celebrations in Mombasa, Kenya". African Studies Review. 18 (3): 35–45. doi:10.2307/523720. JSTOR 523720. S2CID 143826887.
- John H. A. Jewell (1976), Mombasa, the friendly town, Nairobi: East African Pub. House
- Marc J. Swartz (1979). "Religious Courts, Community, and Ethnicity among the Swahili of Mombasa: An Historical Study of Social Boundaries". Africa: Journal of the International African Institute. 49 (1): 29–41. doi:10.2307/1159503. JSTOR 1159503.
- G.S.P. Freeman-Grenville, ed. (1980), The Mombasa rising against the Portuguese, 1631, London: Published for the British Academy by the Oxford University Press, ISBN 0197259928
- Kurula Varkey and Klaus Roesch, ed. (1981). Report on Pilot Study for Conservation and Revitalization of Old Town Mombasa. Nairobi.
- Mano Sassoon (1982). "Sinking of the Santo Antonio de Tanna in Mombasa Harbour". Paideuma. 28: 101–108. JSTOR 41409877.
- James Kirkman (1983). "The Muzungulos of Mombasa". International Journal of African Historical Studies. 16.
- J. Maitland-Jones; et al. (1985). Old Town Mombasa: A Historical Guide. Mombasa: Friends of Fort Jesus.
- Sue Montgomery (1996), "Mombasa", in Trudy Ring (ed.), Middle East and Africa, International Dictionary of Historic Places, Routledge, pp. 512–516, ISBN 9781884964039

Published in 21st century

- Brian Hoyle (2001). "Urban renewal in East African port cities: Mombasa's Old Town waterfront". GeoJournal. 53 (2): 183–197. Bibcode:2001GeoJo..53..183H. doi:10.1023/A:1015704101663. JSTOR 41147599. S2CID 151198638.
- P.J.L. Frankl (2001). "The Early Years of the Mombasa Club: A Home Away from Home for European-Christians". History in Africa. 28: 71–81. doi:10.2307/3172208. JSTOR 3172208. S2CID 162050187.
- Paul Tiyambe Zeleza; Dickson Eyoh, eds. (2003). "Mombasa, Kenya". Encyclopedia of Twentieth-Century African History. Routledge. ISBN 0415234794.
- C. Edmund Bosworth, ed. (2007). "Mombasa". Historic Cities of the Islamic World. Leiden: Koninklijke Brill. ISBN 978-9004153882.
- P.J.L. Frankl (2008). "Mombasa Cathedral and the CMS Compound: The Years of the East Africa Protectorate". History in Africa. 35: 209–229. doi:10.1353/hia.0.0017. JSTOR 25483723. S2CID 162042643.
- Demand for housing in urban Kenya: The case of households in Nairobi and Mombasa counties, 2013 – via Kenya Institute for Public Policy Research and Analysis
- Isolde Brielmaier (2013). "Mombasa on Display: Photography and the Formation of an Urban Public, from the 1940s Onward". In John Peffer and Elisabeth L. Cameron (ed.). Portraiture and Photography in Africa. Indiana University Press. ISBN 978-0-253-00872-5.
