= Tudor, Mombasa =

Tudor
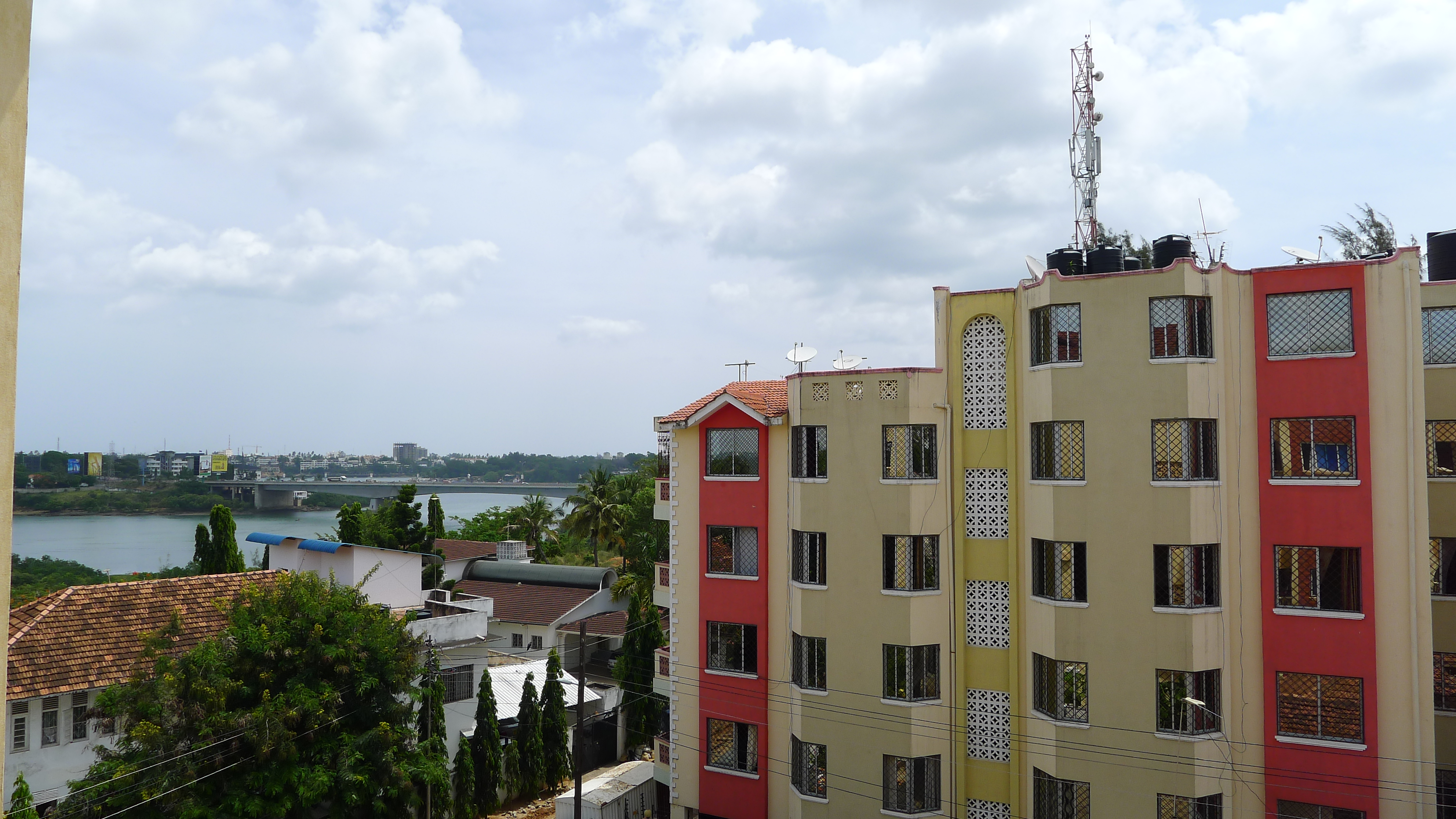

- Location within Kenya
- Coordinates: 4°2′22″S 39°39′48″E
- Country: Kenya
- County: Mombasa County
- City: Mombasa
- Time zone: UTC+3 (EAT)

Tudor is a subdivision of Mombasa, Kenya.

== Geography ==
The area is located to the north of Mombasa Island, bordered by Jomo Kenyatta Avenue to the south-west and Tudor Creek to the north-east, from the Makupa Bridge to the Nyali Bridge. On the south-east axis it is bordering the Ronald Ngala Avenue, from the Saba Saba (77) Junction to the Nyali bridge.

== Technical University of Mombasa.[Formerly known as Mombasa Polytechnic] ==
Tudor is the location of Technical University of Mombasa, a higher education facility offering subjects in engineering, business and sciences. The institution is offering certificate, diploma, degree and PhD levels although mostly in the School of Business
