= Chaani, Kenya =

Suburb of Mombasa, Kenya

Chaani is a suburb of Mombasa, Kenya. It is bordered by Port Reitz to the west, Changamwe to the north and Kilindini Harbour to the south. It is linked to Mombasa Island by the Kipevu Causeway.

== History ==
The origins of Chaani are not clear, but current residents believe that the original settlers were of a variety of races – including Arab, Swahili, and people from the Mijikenda ethnic groups. This is certainly before the British protectorate of Kenya, making Chaani's origins earlier than 1920. Before then, the area was part of the Sultan of Zanzibar's Zanj region.

== Industry ==
Chaani is the location of the East African Oil Refineries Tank Farm. It is served by a branch line of the Uganda Railway.

Preceding station	Uganda Railway	Following station
Changamwe	Chaani Oil Refinery; Chaani Branch	Terminus
