= Nyali Bridge (1931) =

Old Nyali Bridge
- Coordinates: 4°2′51″S 39°40′42″E
- Carries: Road traffic, pedestrians
- Crosses: Tudor Creek
- Locale: Kenya

Characteristics
- Design: floating pontoon bridge
- Total length: 400 m (1,300 ft)
- Longest span: 250 m (820 ft)

History
- Closed: 1980 (replaced in 1981)

The Nyali Bridge was a floating pontoon bridge linking Mombasa Island to the Kenyan mainland.

The bridge linked the Mzizima district of Mombasa to Nyali, and was built in 1931.

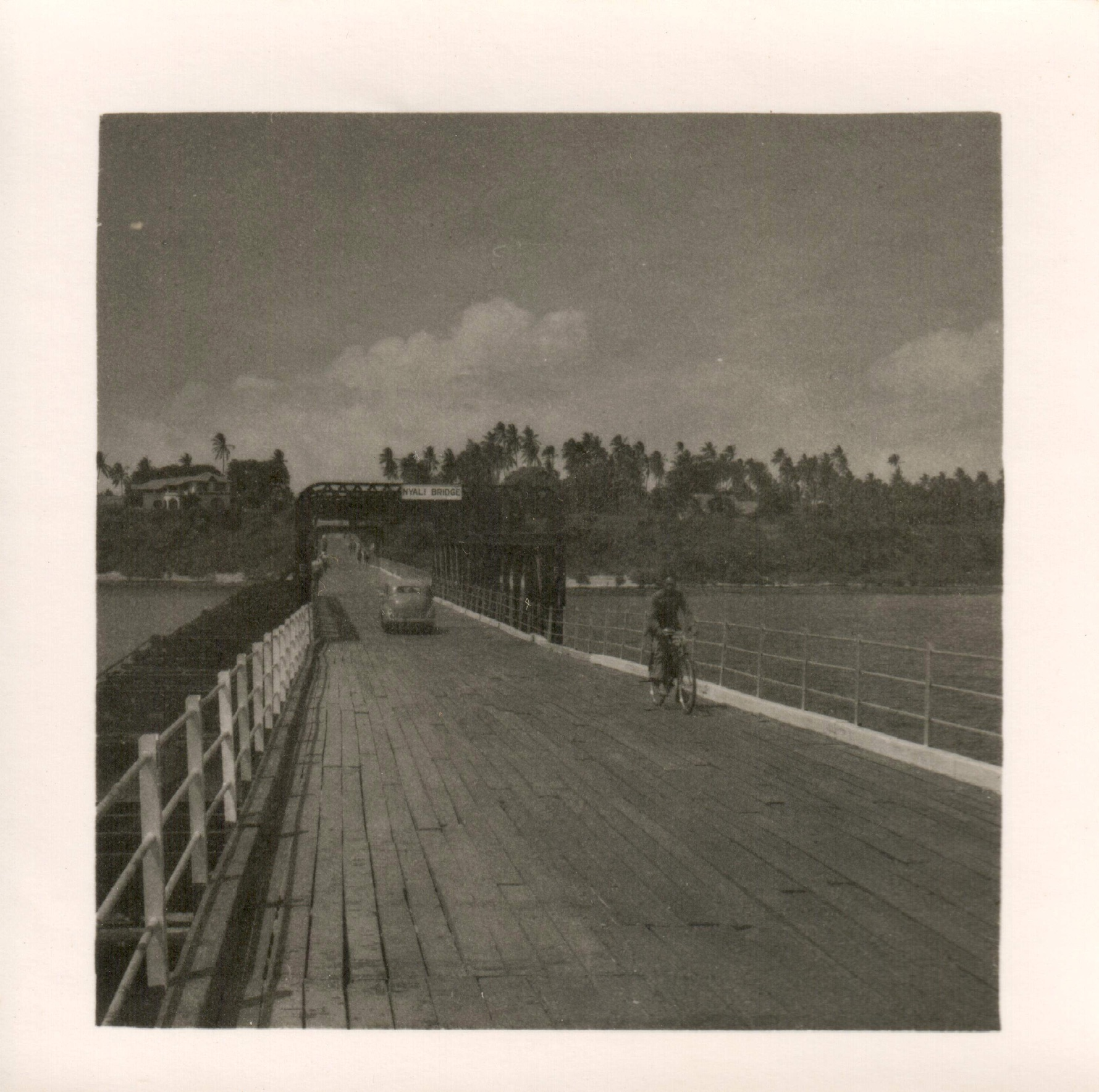

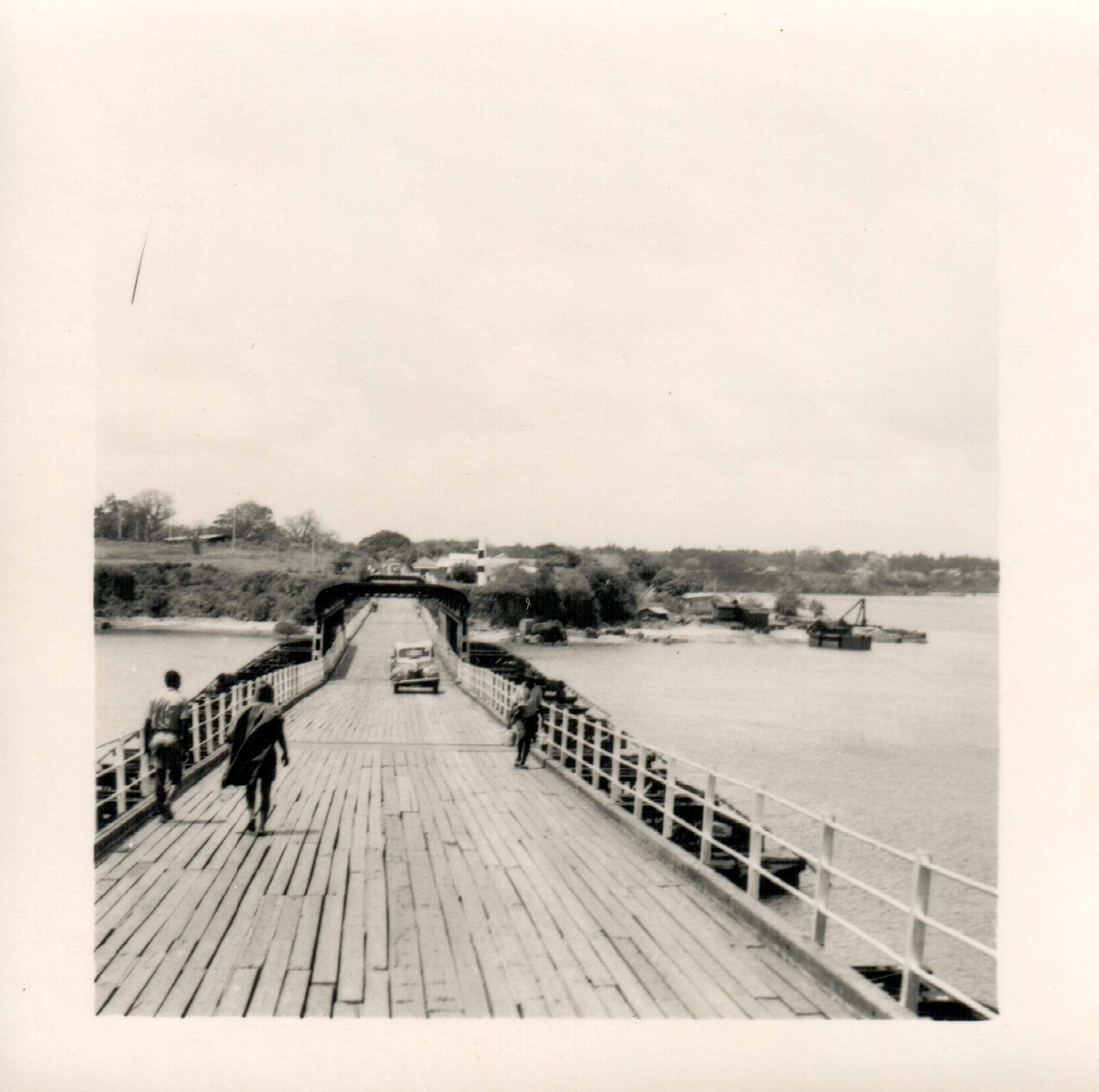

In 1980, the bridge was superseded by the New Nyali Bridge (located approximately 0.55 miles (0.89 km) to the north), leaving the steel bridge to be dismantled for scrap. The western (Mombasa) approach to the bridge is the only remaining part of the bridge but one of the pontoon mooring anchors is on nearby display at the Tamarind Restaurant.
