= Martyrs of Mombasa =

17th-century Christian martyrs killed in Mombasa, Kenya

Servants of God Martyrs of Mombasa

Martyrs
- Died: August 1631; Mombasa, Portuguese East Africa present-day Kenya
- Venerated in: Catholic Church
- Beatified: Cause introduced in the 17th century
- Attributes: Martyrs of the faith

The Martyrs of Mombasa were a group of approximately 288 Portuguese and African Christians who were killed in Mombasa (in present-day Kenya) in August 1631 during an uprising led by Yusuf ibn al-Hasan, the Swahili sultan of Mombasa. Hasan had renounced Christianity and ordered Christians in the city to convert to Islam. According to Augustinian and Portuguese accounts, those who refused to apostatize were killed.

The martyrs are venerated in the Catholic Church, and their cause for beatification has been ongoing since the 17th century. The three principal Augustinian priests among them, Fr. Anthony of the Nativity, Fr. Anthony of the Passion, and Fr. Dominick of the Birth of Christ, are recognised as Servants of God.

== Background ==
=== Portuguese presence in Mombasa ===
The Portuguese first arrived on the East African coast in 1498 with Vasco da Gama. Construction of Fort Jesus began in 1593 under the direction of the Italian military engineer João Batista Cairato.

In the late 16th century, missionaries of the Order of Saint Augustine established missions in Mombasa and elsewhere along the Swahili coast. By the early 17th century, the Augustinians maintained churches, schools, and charitable institutions near Fort Jesus.

Portuguese authority on the Swahili coast remained unstable and was frequently opposed by local Muslim elites and regional powers from Arabia.

=== Yusuf ibn al-Hasan ===
The previous sultan of Mombasa died in 1609, leaving behind his young son, Yusuf al-Hasan, who was sent to Goa and educated by the Augustinians. He was baptised as Dom Jerónimo Chingulia and later returned to Mombasa as a Portuguese-backed ruler.

According to Portuguese and Augustinian sources, Yusuf later returned to Islam and became increasingly hostile to Portuguese rule. Tensions between the Portuguese administration and sections of the Swahili population intensified during the late 1620s.

== Massacre of 1631 ==
On 15 August 1631, during the feast of the Assumption, Yusuf entered Fort Jesus under the pretence of making a formal visit and killed the Portuguese commander. Fighting quickly spread through the town, and many Christians fled to the Augustinian church for refuge.

The Augustinian priests Fr. Anthony of the Nativity, Fr. Anthony of the Passion, and Fr. Dominick of the Birth of Christ attempted to negotiate with Yusuf. According to later accounts, Yusuf offered to spare their lives if they converted to Islam, but they refused.

On 20 August, Yusuf's followers attacked the church and killed those sheltering there. On the following day, additional Christians, including women and children, were reportedly led toward the harbour under the promise of evacuation before being killed.

Among the dead were 47 Portuguese men, 39 Portuguese women, 59 Portuguese children, and numerous African Christians and their families. Isabel Varella, Yusuf's wife, reportedly refused to renounce Christianity and was enslaved rather than killed.

== Aftermath and legacy ==
Following the massacre, surviving Augustinians compiled accounts of the killings, and an ecclesiastical inquiry was opened in Goa in 1632 to determine whether the victims should be regarded as martyrs.

The cause was later referred to Rome but appears to have lapsed during the 17th century for uncertain reasons. Interest in the cause was revived in the 20th and 21st centuries through the efforts of Augustinian historians and postulators.

Historians have interpreted the uprising differently, with some emphasizing that it may have been anti-colonial resistance to Portuguese domination, while others stress the religious dimension of the killings and the subsequent martyr tradition.

The Portuguese eventually reoccupied Mombasa, but their influence on the Kenyan coast declined steadily. Fort Jesus finally fell to Omani forces in 1698.

== Principals among the martyrs ==
Name	Role	Fate
Fr. Anthony of the Nativity, O.S.A.	Augustinian friar	Martyred in August 1631
Fr. Anthony of the Passion, O.S.A.	Augustinian friar	Martyred in August 1631
Fr. Dominick of the Birth of Christ, O.S.A.	Augustinian friar	Martyred in August 1631
Don Antony of Malindi	African Christian convert and relative of Yusuf	Martyred in August 1631
Isabel Varella	Wife of Yusuf ibn al-Hasan	Enslaved after refusing to renounce Christianity

== See also ==
- Fort Jesus
- Yusuf ibn al-Hasan
- Order of Saint Augustine
- Uganda Martyrs
