= Mombasa Old Town =

Old Town of Mombasa
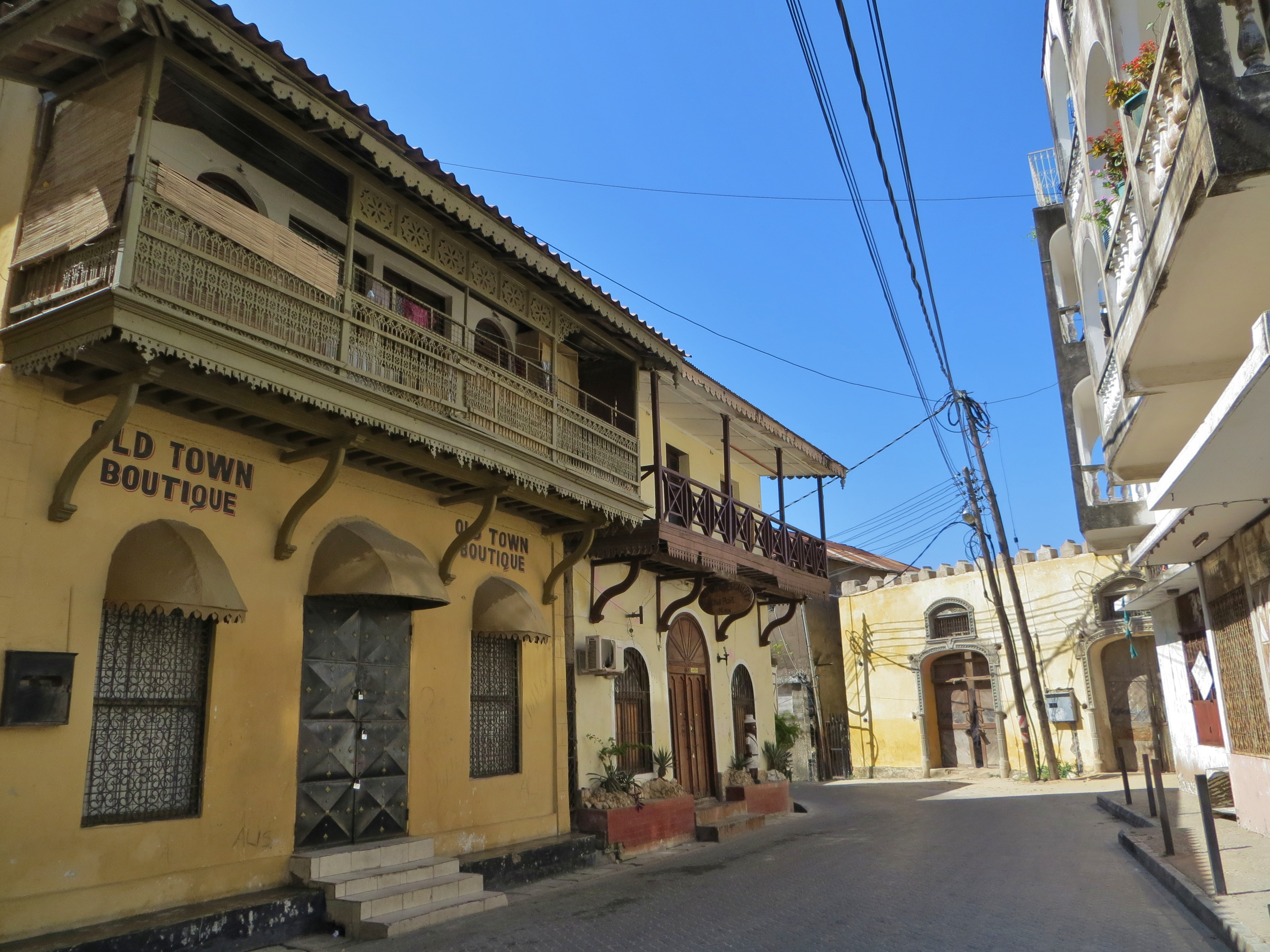

- Location within Kenya
- Coordinates: 4°3′32″S 39°40′35″E
- Country: Kenya
- County: Mombasa County
- Constituency: Mvita Constituency
- Time zone: UTC+3 (EAT)

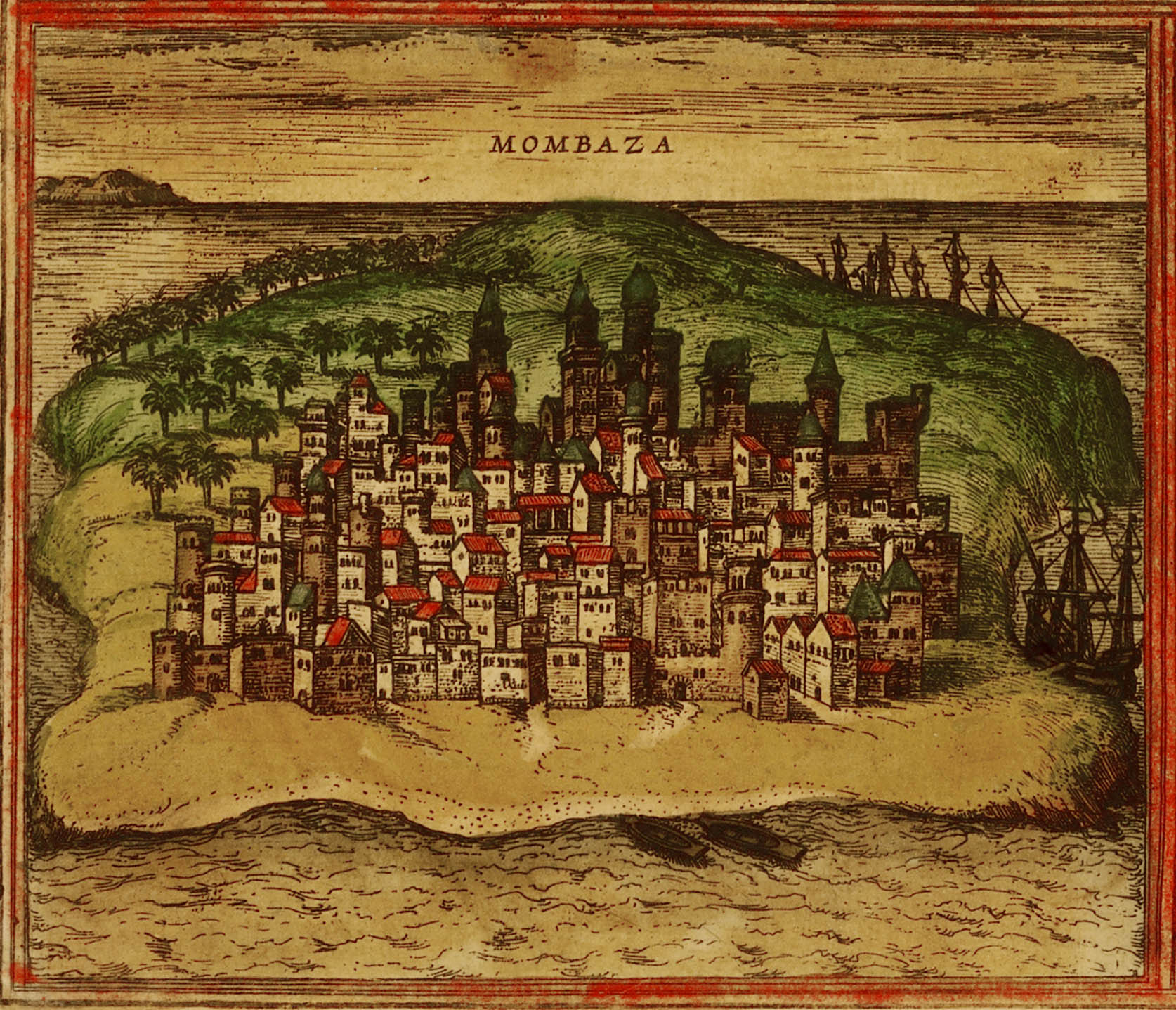
Old Town in 1572

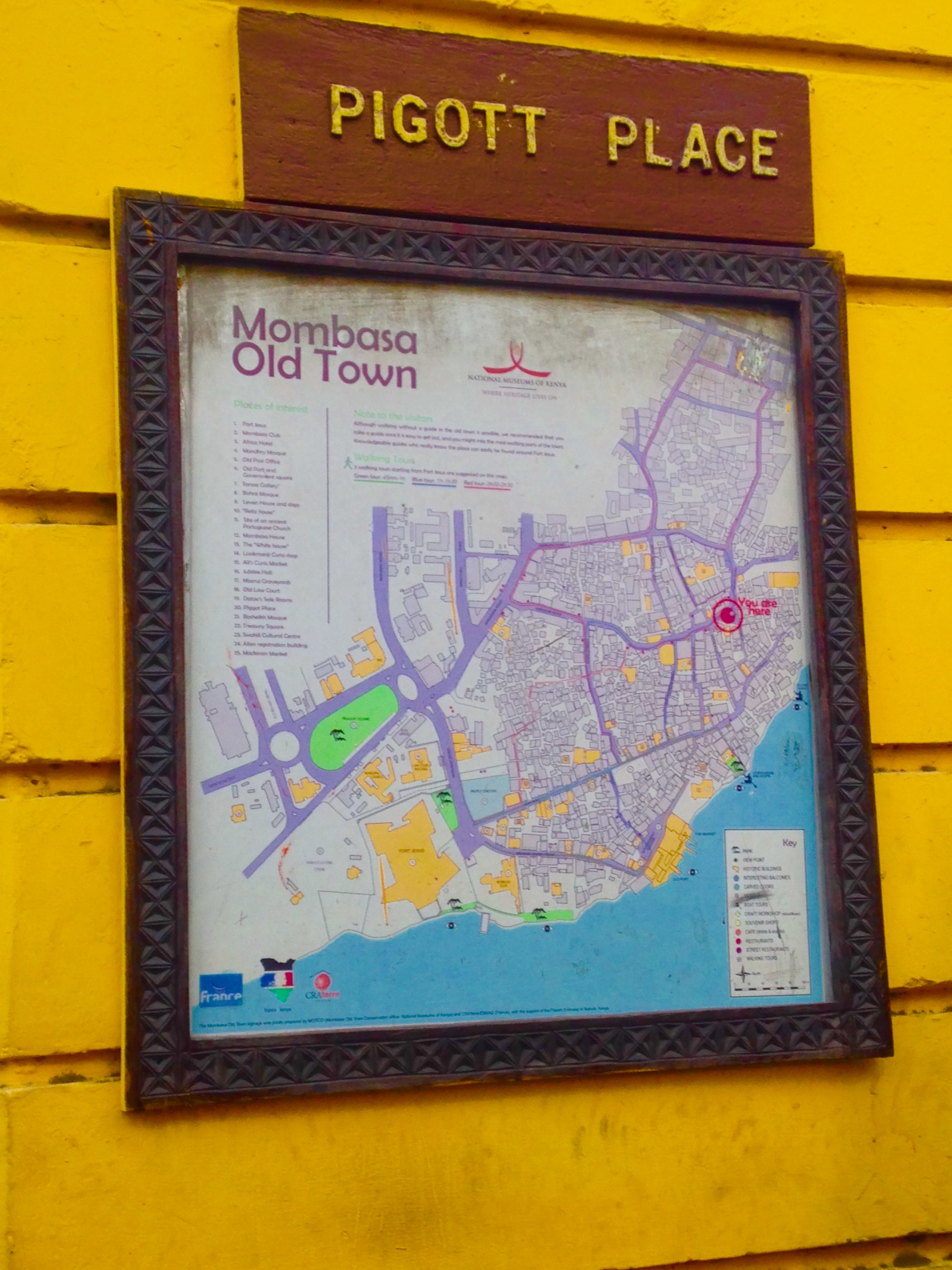
Old Town map

The Old Town of Mombasa, also known as Mji Wa Kale (Swahili for 'old town'), is the old part of Mombasa, the main city of Mombasa County in Kenya. Situated on the south-east side of Mombasa Island, the Old Town covers an area of 72 hectares (180 acres), and is inhabited by a mix of Swahili, Arab, Persian, Indian, Asian, Portuguese and British settlers.

In 1997, the Old Town and Fort Jesus were submitted by the National Museums of Kenya for selection in UNESCO's list of World Heritage Sites.

== Geography ==
The area is located to the east of Mombasa Island, adjacent to Tudor Creek.

== Architecture ==
Buildings in the Old Town are mostly Swahili, however, the many other ones are influenced by Mombasa's trade culture and foreign occupation, with many examples of colonial Portuguese styles from the 16th century and modern Islamic architecture.

== Attractions ==
=== Fort Jesus ===
The Portuguese Fort Jesus is located in the Old Town, and is Mombasa's most popular tourist attraction.

== See also ==
- Changamwe
- Bamburi
- Kipevu

== Sources ==
- MombasaInfo (2009a), Old Town, MombasaInfo, archived from the original on 17 March 2016
- MombasaInfo (2009b), Fort Jesus, MombasaInfo, archived from the original on 14 April 2009
- Planetware (2011), The Old Town Description, Richmond Hill, Ontario: PlanetWare, inc.
- UNESCO (2011a), "Mombasa Old Town", World Heritage Convention, United Nations: United Nations Educational, Scientific and Cultural Organization
- UNESCO (2011b), "Fort Jesus", World Heritage Convention, United Nations: United Nations Educational, Scientific and Cultural Organization
