= Makupa Roundabout =

Location
- Mombasa, Mombasa County, Kenya
- Roads at junction: Makupa Causeway; Jomo Kenyatta Avenue

Construction
- Type: Roundabout

The Makupa Circus is a primary road junction in Mombasa, Kenya. The roundabout is situated in the Makupa area of the island.

The roundabout serves the majority of migrating traffic in Mombasa. It is the first major road junction on the island after transversing the Makupa Causeway, and forms the northern terminus of Jomo Kenyatta Avenue.

Elim Evangelical Church lies to the west of the roundabout.
