= Magongo =

Magongo may refer to:

- Magongo, Nigeria, in Ogori/Magongo Local Government Area
- Magongo, Kenya, a suburb of Mombasa
