= Jomo Kenyatta Avenue =

Road in Mombasa, Kenya

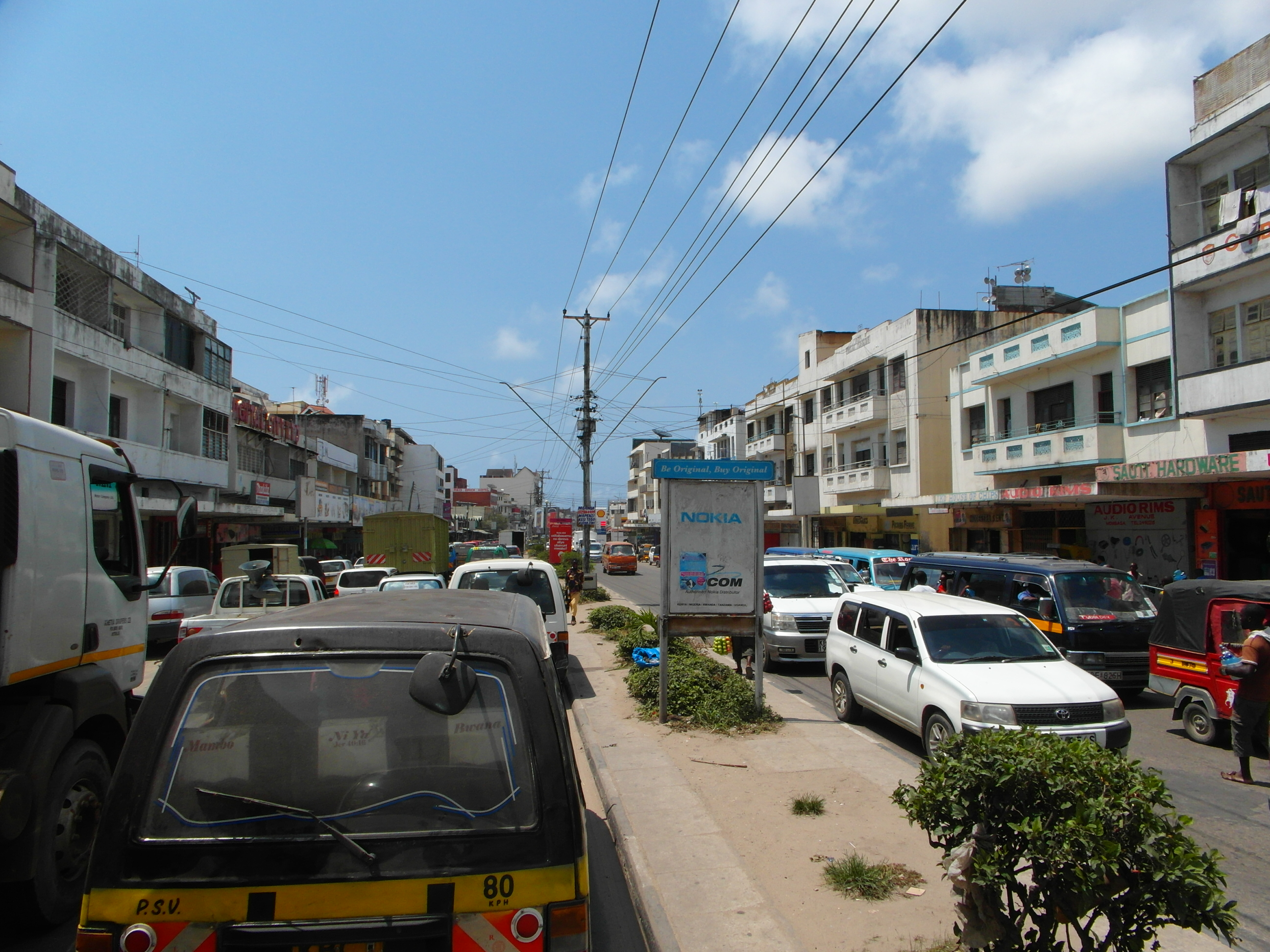
- Jomo Kenyatta Avenue in 2013
- Interactive map of Jomo Kenyatta Avenue
- Part of: A109
- Namesake: Jomo Kenyatta
- Type: Thoroughfare
- Length: 1.9 mi (3.1 km)
- Location: Mombasa, Kenya
- Coordinates: 4°03′01″S 39°39′53″E
- Northwestern end: Makupa Circus
- Southeastern end: Jomo Kenyatta Roundabout

Jomo Kenyatta Avenue is a major thoroughfare in Mombasa, Kenya. The majority of the road is a six-lane dual carriageway, separated by a concrete reservation of approximately 3 metres (9.8 ft) in width.

The road travels southeast from Makupa Circus, and terminates at a junction with Digo Road. Traffic on the road is restricted to 40 kilometres per hour (25 mph). The crossroads with Ronald Ngala Road and Mwatate Street provides one of Mombasa's two sets of traffic lights (the other being at the west end of the Nyali Bridge).
