= Nyali =

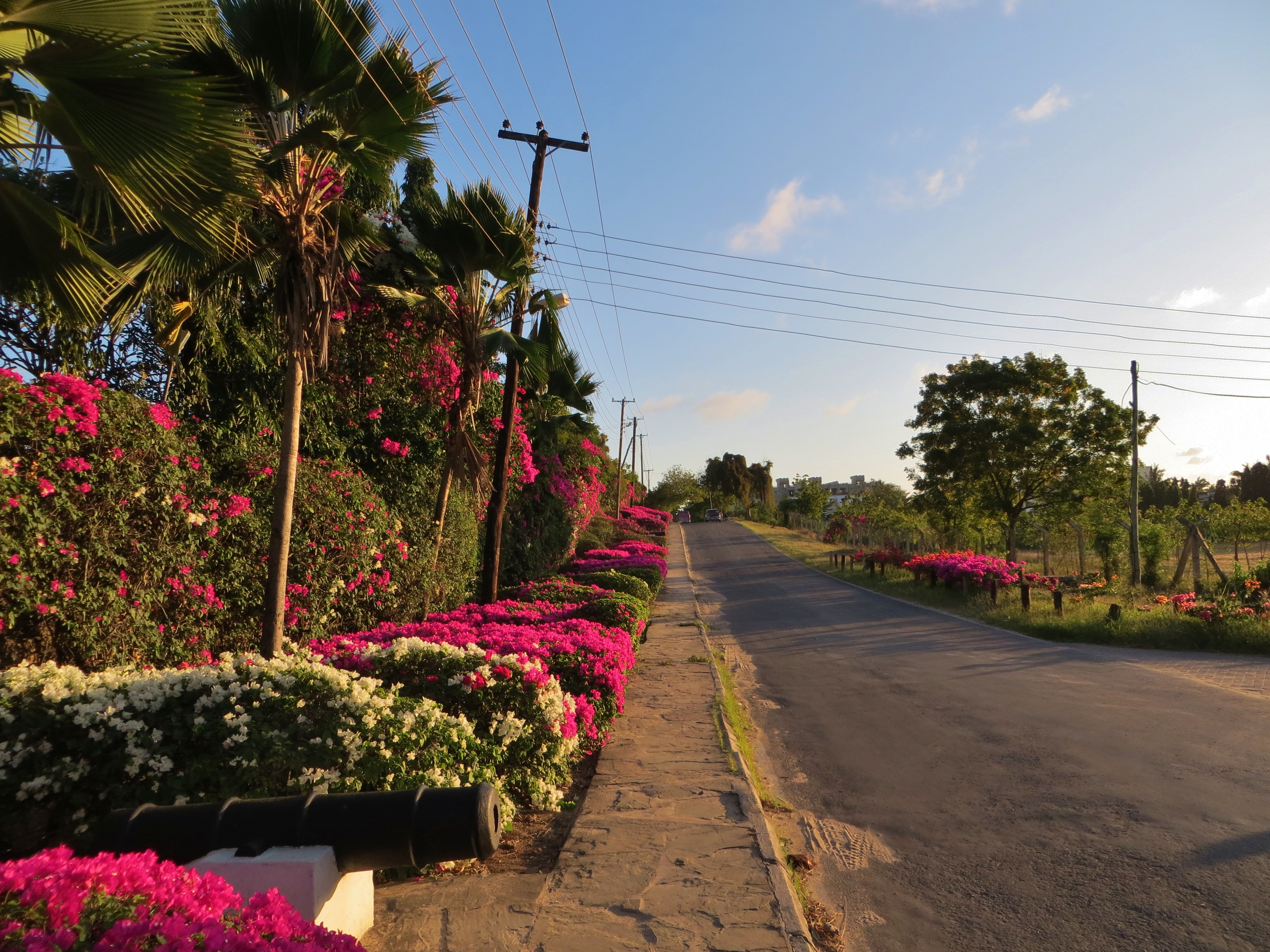
- Mount Kenya Road, bordering the seaside resorts.

- Location within Kenya
- Coordinates: 4.05°S 39.667°E
- Country: Kenya
- County: Mombasa County

Population (2019)
  - Total: 216,577
- Time zone: UTC+3 (EAT)

Nyali is a residential area and Sub-County within Mombasa City, located on the mainland north of Mombasa County. It is connected to Mombasa Island by the New Nyali Bridge. Nyali is known for its many high-class hotels and residential houses, modern standards, and long white sand beaches making it a popular destination for both local and foreign tourists.

== Description ==
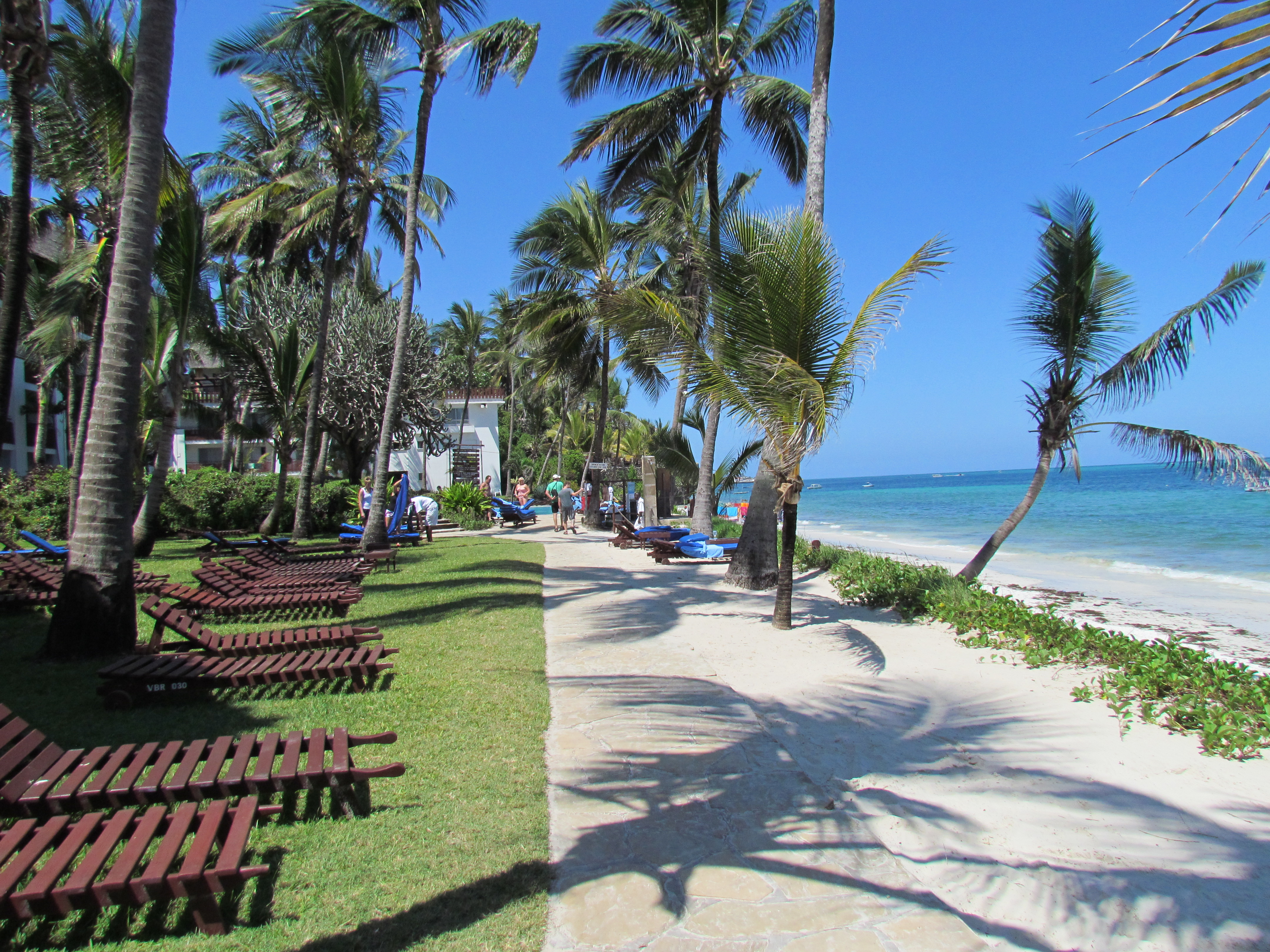
Nyali beach

Nyali is a relatively affluent residential area, bordered by Kongowea to the north and north east, Mkomani to the west and the Indian Ocean to the south. It is characterised by low-density, high-value housing, malls and beachfront resorts and hotels.

There are a number of points of interest in Nyali, including Mamba Village(the biggest crocodile farm in Africa), Nyali Golf Club, Dwarikadham Hindu temple, Lord Shiva Gombeshwar Caves, several consulates and some of the most prestigious academic institutions in the Coastal region.

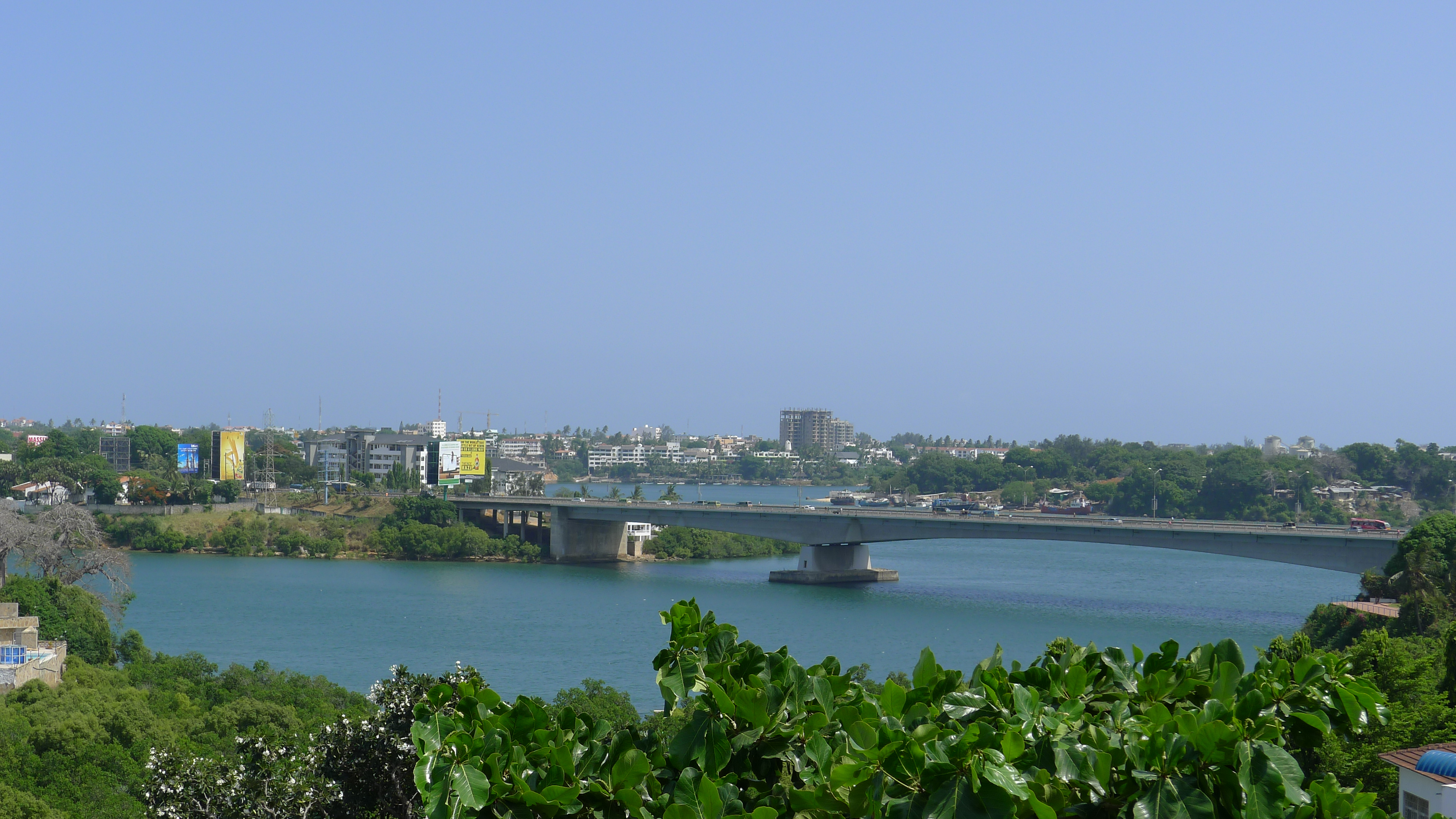
The Nyali Bridge, linking Nyali to Mombasa Island.

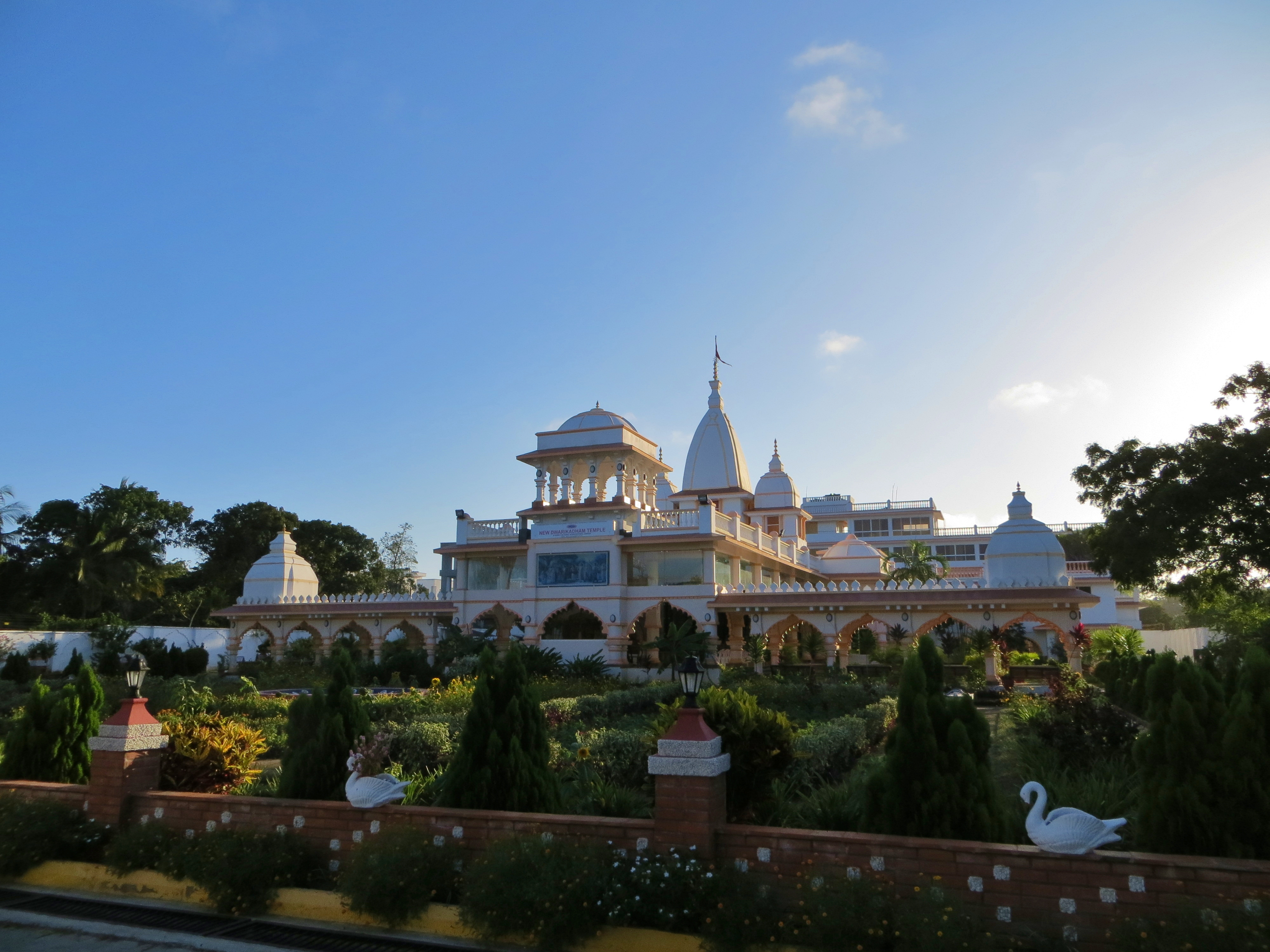
The Hindu New Dwarikadham Temple of Nyali.

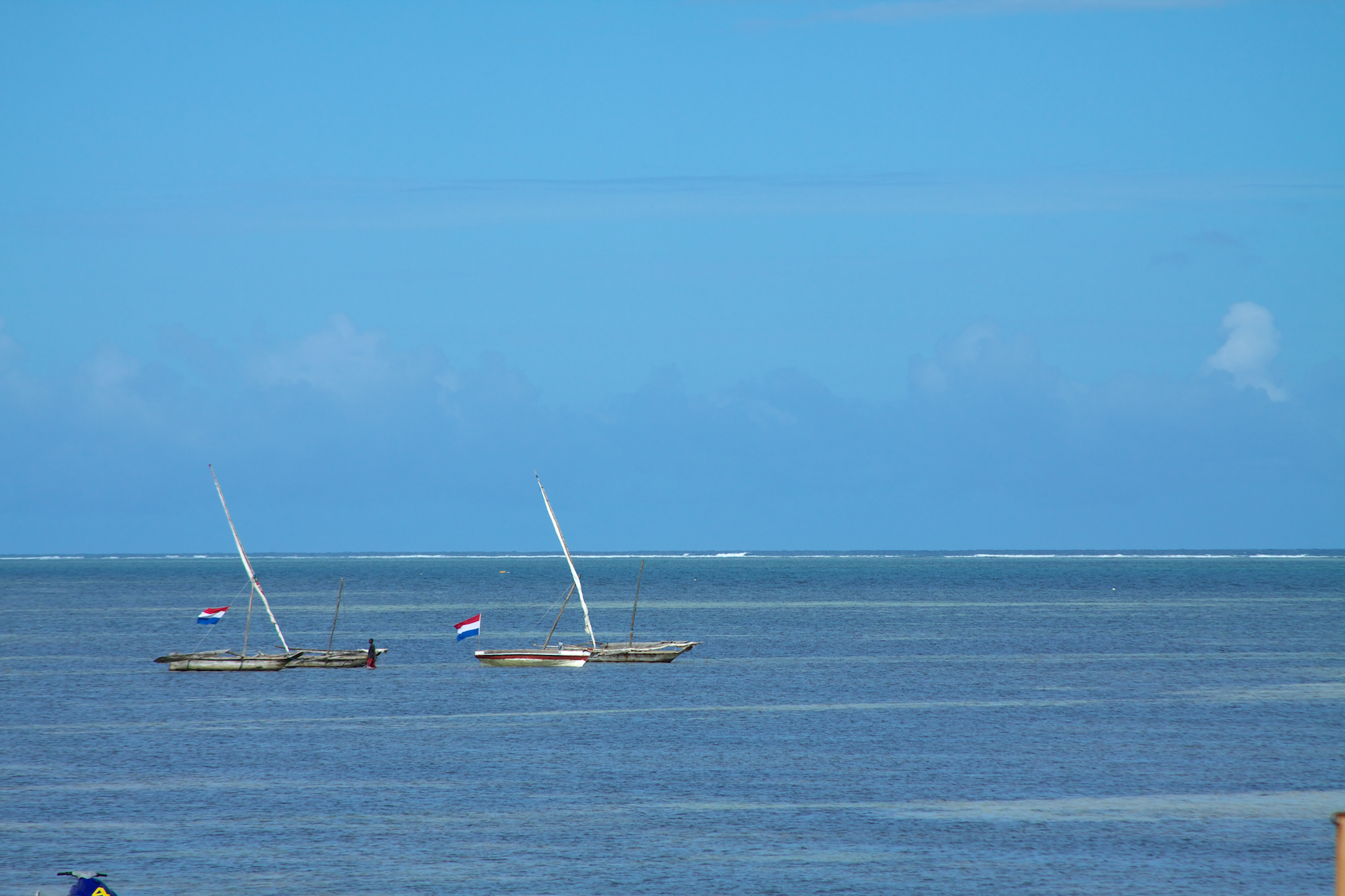
Trimarans in the lagoon at Nyali.

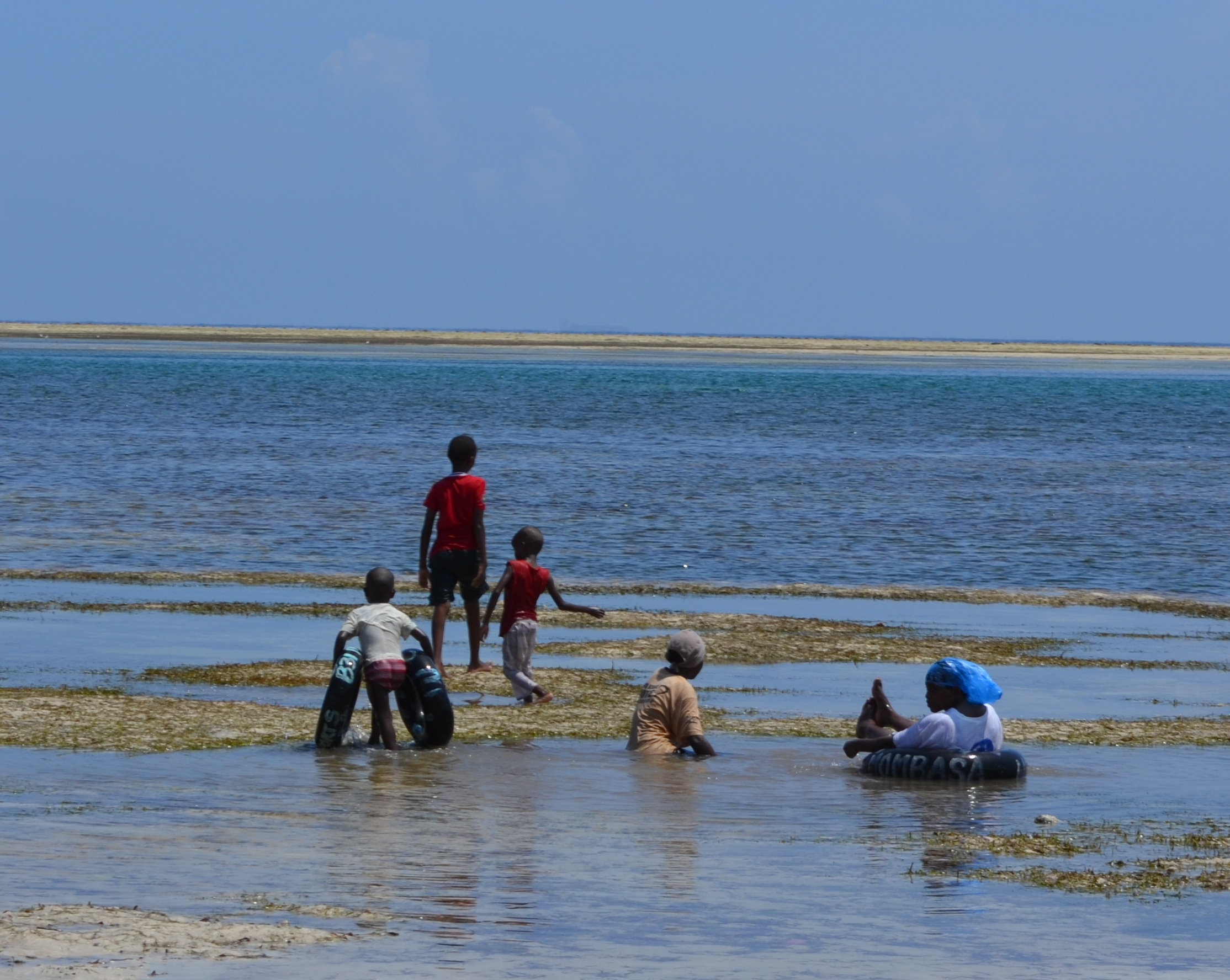
Group of beachgoers at Nyali Beach.

== Tourism ==
Nyali is renowned for its tourist potential, thanks to its calm water, its accommodation facilities and its coast bordered with white sand beaches protected by a coral reef, loved by divers. This is a part of the Mombasa Marine Reserve, managed by Kenya Wildlife Service.

Nyali also shelters many luxury hotels on almost all the seaside (Sai Rock Hotel & Spa, Sarova Whitesands, Nyali Beach Resort, Voyager Hotel, Reef Hotel, Mombasa Beach Hotel), alternating with more affordable hotels (Backpackers Hotel) and with numerous places of entertainment and activities for the tourists (beach volley, windsurfing, scuba diving, kite surf, jet skiing and sailing).

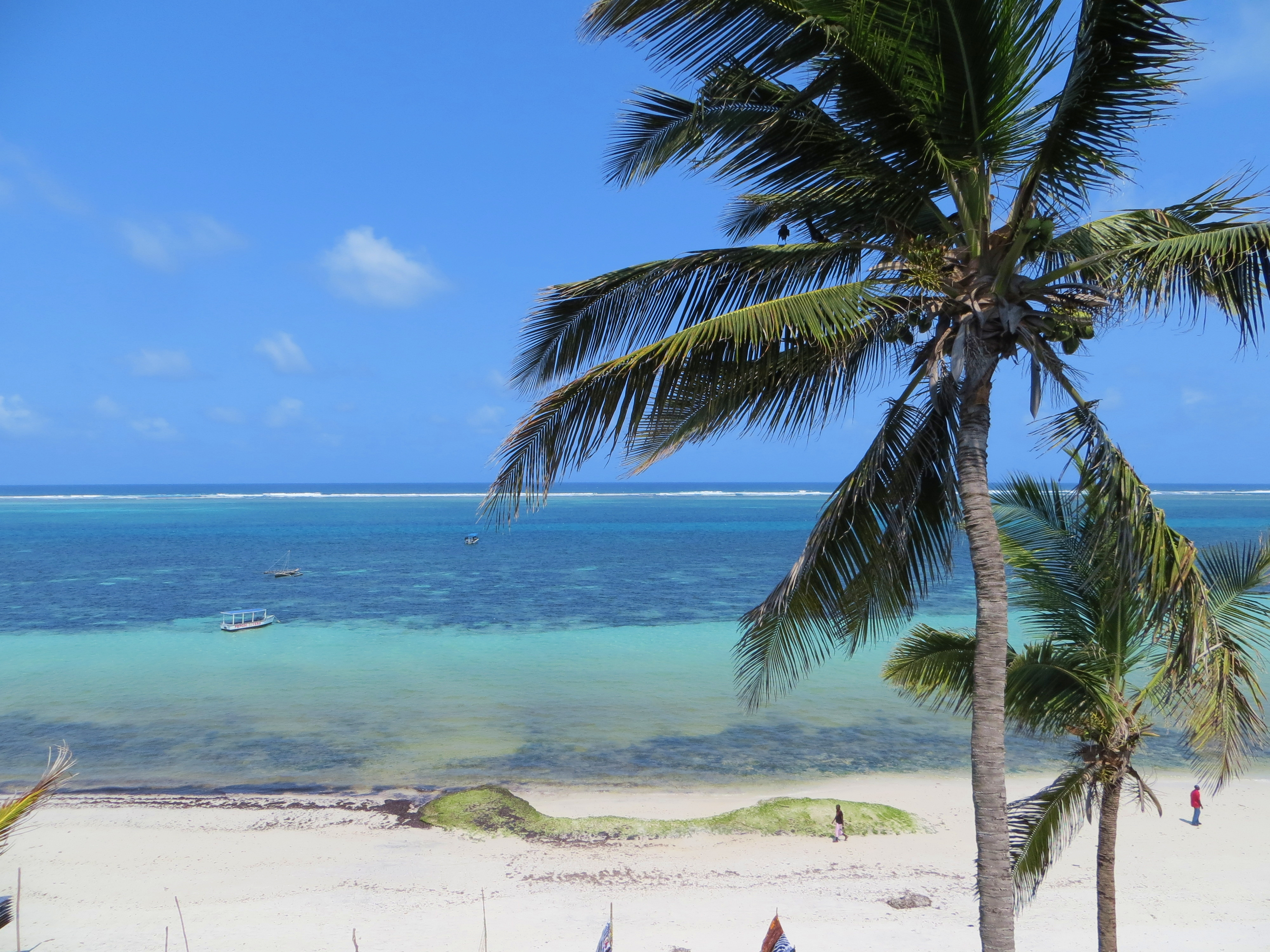
Nyali Beach on front of Voyager Hotel.

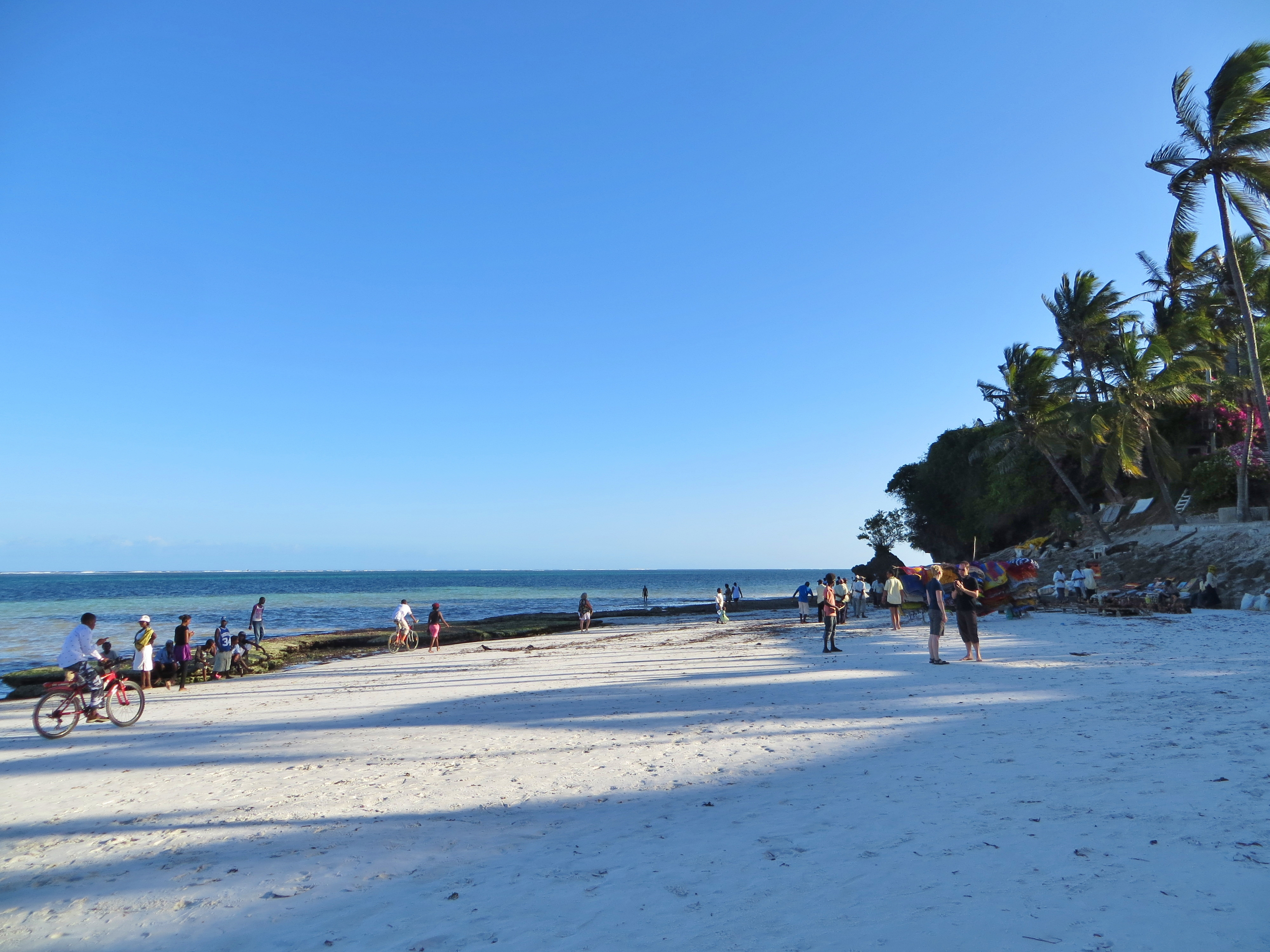
The same place from a different view.

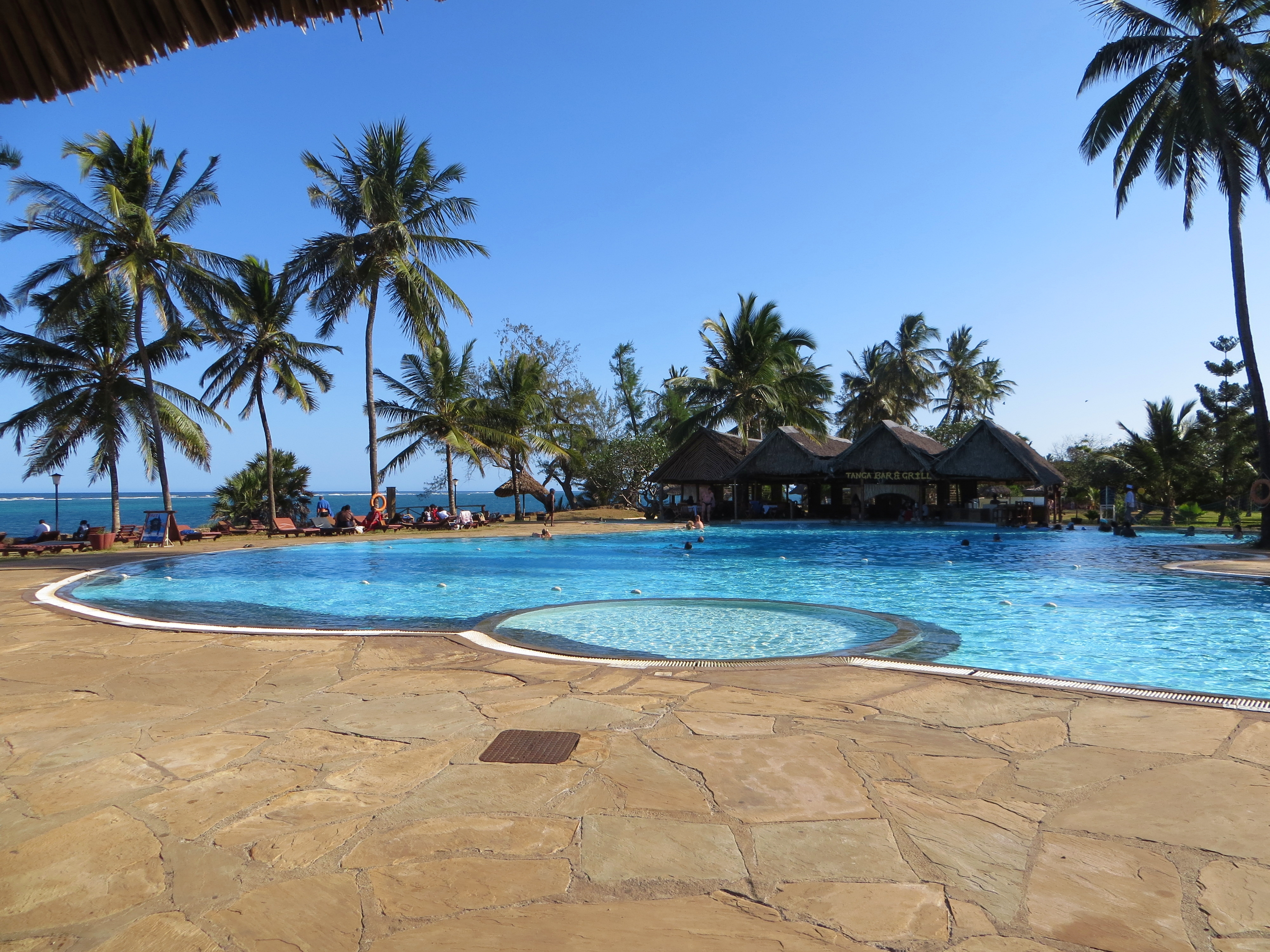
Reef Hotel giant swimming pool.

== See also ==
- Kisauni Constituency
