= Makupa Causeway Bridge =

Bridge in Kenya

Makupa Causeway bridge
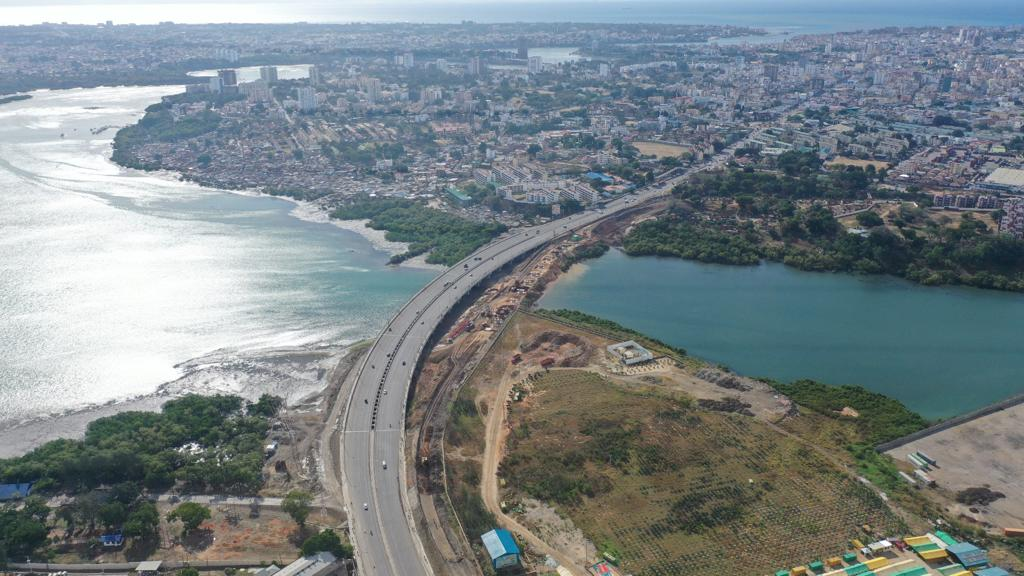
- Completed Makupa Causeway Bridge
- Coordinates: 4°02′02″S 39°39′09″E
- Carries: Meter gauge railway

Characteristics
- Design: Post tensioned prestressed bridge
- Material: C50 Posttension girders

History
- Opened: 2022

Location
- Interactive map of Makupa Causeway bridge

The Makupa Causeway Bridge is 457 m long bridge in Kenya that spans the Makupa Causeway, which links Mombasa to the Kenyan mainland. The bridge was opened on 4 August 2022 by President Uhuru Kenyatta.

The bridge has a turning radius of 650m curve. It has 11 spans of 24.60m each. It has also boasts of 9 pile caps each having 4 piles and one pile cap with 5 piles while the Aburtment each has 6 piles compounding to 53 piles. The deepest pile being 49m while the shortest pile being 35m.All these piles are designed as friction piles.

The geology is mainly composed of quaternary Holocene’s and muddy silts and silty clays.

All piles aburtments and piers are designed with C35 concretes while the piles cap and Girders designed to C50 concrete.

== Design and construction ==
=== Scope of inspection ===
The scope of works for the project is generally divided into three parts:

1. Relocation of services
2. Construction of the Makupa causeway bridge
3. Dredging of backfills

=== Main works' quantities ===
Constructions works covers the following areas:

1. Site Clearance
2. Earthworks
3. Bridge Works
4. Culvert Works
5. Drainage works
6. Old railways reclamations
