= Giovanni Battista Cairati =

Italian architect and engineer

Giovanni Battista Cairati (Cairate, 16th century – Goa, 1596), known in Portuguese as João Baptista Cairato, was an Italian architect and engineer. Cairati was a leading military architect and, after the union of the Portuguese and Spanish empires in 1580, he was sent to the east by Philip II to redesign many of the fortresses. He dominated Portuguese military architecture in the Orient from the African coast to Malacca from 1583 to 1596.

== Biography ==
Born in the small town of Cairate, Lombardy, he began working, around 1560, in the service of the Order of the Knights Hospitaller and built fortifications in Malta and Sardinia. Back in Milan, he directed and supervised the fortification works in the city in the years 1560–1570.

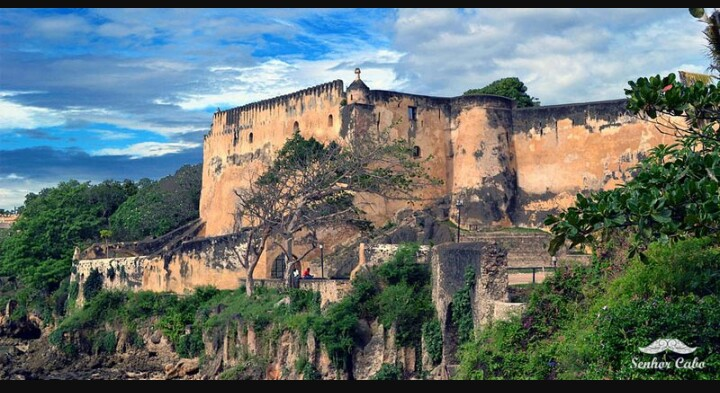
View of Fort Jesus in Mombasa

In 1577 he entered the service of Philip II of Spain and in 1583 he was appointed chief engineer of the Estado da Índia and charged with the urgent task of surveying and rebuilding the most strategic of the Portuguese fortresses. Cairati spent a decade (1585–95) modernizing the fortresses of the Estado da Índia through the introduction of the trace italienne. He worked on the construction of fortifications in various places in East Africa and India such as Vasai, Malacca, Mannar, Hormuz, Muscat, Daman and Mombasa.

Around 1593, he designed Fort Jesus in East Africa (now Kenya). The fort, built between 1593 and 1596 and inspired by the architectural models of the Italian Renaissance, is his last known work. Cairati selected the site and laid out the plan of the fortress, but probably never saw the completed building. He died in Goa in 1596 and was succeeded by Julio Simão.

== Bibliography ==
- Boxer, Charles; Azevedo, Carlos de (1960). A Fortaleza de Jesus e os Portugueses em Mombaça. Lisboa: Centro de Estudos de História Ultramarina. pp. 79–105.
- Kirkman, James S. (1974). Fort Jesus: A Portuguese Fortress on the East African Coast. Oxford: Clarendon Press. ISBN 9780199200351.
- Bethencourt, Francisco (2021). "The Portuguese Empire (1415–1822)". In Peter Fibiger Bang; C. A. Bayly; Walter Scheidel (eds.). The Oxford World History of Empire. Vol. 2: The History of Empires. New York. pp. 832–861. doi:10.1093/oso/9780197532768.003.0030. ISBN 978-0-19-753276-8.
