= Technical University of Mombasa =

University in Kenya

- Former name: The Mombasa Polytechnic University College
- Type: Public
- Established: 1951; 2013 - university status
- Chairman: Robert Arunga
- Vice-Chancellor: Laila Abubakar
- Dean: Dr. Sameer Kamrudin Bachani
- Students: 10,475 (2023)
- Location: Tom Mboya Street, Mombasa, Kenya, Mombasa, Mombasa County, Kenya; 1°05′43″S 37°00′53″E
- Website: tum.ac.ke

Technical University of Mombasa (TUM) is a public university located in the coastal city of Mombasa. It is amongst the oldest institutions of higher learning in Kenya. It is one of the national polytechnics recently elevated to a fully fledged university in Kenya. It was awarded its charter in 2013 by-then president Mwai Kibaki.

== Schools ==
- School of Engineering & Technology
- School of Applied and Health Sciences
- School of Business
- Institute of Computing and Informatics
- School of Humanities and Social Sciences
- School of Medicine
- Institute of Research, Innovation and Extension (ARIE)

== TUM History ==
TUM can be traced back to the late 1940s when Sir Philip Mitchell, Aga Khan III, the Sultan of Zanzibar, and Secretary of State for the colonies, Sir Bernard Reilly started the Mombasa Institute of Muslim Education (MIOME). After its inception, MIOME started providing technical education to Muslim students of East Africa. In May 1951, MIOME enrolled its first batch of students to undergo a technical education programme which placed special emphasis on Mechanical Engineering, Electrical Engineering, Seamanship and Navigation, and Woodwork.

In 1966 MIOME become Mombasa Technical Institute (MTI) and started to admit all people from different walks of life regardless of religion or race.

In the year 1976, MTI became Mombasa Polytechnic. Mombasa Polytechnic continued to develop more market driven programs, anchored on the five established Departments of Business Studies, Electrical and Electronics Engineering, Building and Civil Engineering, Mechanical Engineering and Applied Sciences. On 23 August 2007, through a Legal Notice Mombasa Polytechnic was elevated to a University College thus the name Mombasa Polytechnic University College (MPUC).

In 2013 after being elevated to a fully fledged University Mombasa Polytechnic University College (MPUC) became Technical University of Mombasa (TUM). TUM has opened two strategic satellite Campuses in Kwale and Lamu County.

== Directorates ==
- Directorate of TVET
- Directorate of Quality Assurance
- TUM Enterprises (TUMEL)
- School of Graduate Studies

== Campuses ==
- Main Campus, Tudor, Mombasa
- Lamu Campus
- Kwale Campus

== See also ==
- Education in Kenya
- Universities in Kenya
- Technical University of Kenya
- List of universities in Kenya
