= Fort Jesus =

Fort located on Mombasa Island, Kenya

Fort Jesus, Mombasa
UNESCO World Heritage Site
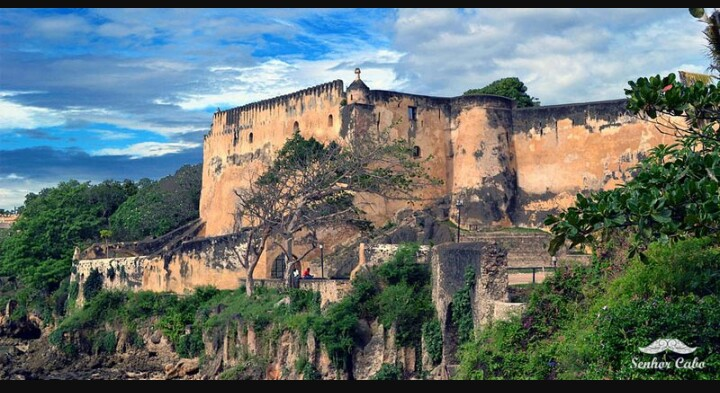

- Location within Kenya
- Location: Mombasa Old Town, Mombasa, Kenya
- Criteria: Cultural: ii, v
- Reference: 1295
- Inscription: 2011 (35th Session)
- Area: 2.36 ha (5.8 acres)
- Buffer zone: 31 ha (77 acres)
- Coordinates: 4°03′46″S 39°40′47″E

Fort Jesus (Portuguese: Forte Jesus de Mombaça; Swahili: Ngome la Yesu la Mombasa), is a fort located on Mombasa Island. Designed by the Italian architect Giovanni Battista Cairati, it was built between 1593 and 1596 by order of King Felipe II of Spain, who also reigned as King Filipe I of Portugal and the Algarves, to guard the Old Port of Mombasa. Fort Jesus was the only fort maintained by the Portuguese on the Swahili coast and is recognised as a testament to the first successful attempt by a Western power to establish influence over the Indian Ocean trade.

Cairati, inspired by Italian architect Pietro Cataneo, designed the fort, with the master builder being Gaspar Rodrigues. This was Cairati's last overseas work. Although the design of Fort Jesus is an example of Renaissance architecture, the masonry techniques, building materials, and labor are believed to have been provided by the local Swahili people. The fort, built in the shape of a man viewed from the air, is roughly square with four bulwarks at its corners and is considered a masterpiece of late Renaissance military fortification.

== Historical significance ==
Fort Jesus was captured and recaptured at least nine times between 1631, when the Portuguese lost it to Sultan Yusuf ibn al-Hasan of Mombasa, and 1895, it fell under British rule and was converted into a prison. After the Portuguese recaptured it from the Sultan in 1632, they refurbished it and built more fortifications, subsequently making it harder for the fort to fall. The fort was subject to an epic two-year siege from 1696 to 1698 by the Omani Arabs, led by Saif bin Sultan. The capture of the fort marked the end of Portuguese presence on the coast, although they briefly captured and re-occupied it between 1728 and 1729 with the help of the Swahili city-states. The fort fell under local rule from 1741 to 1837, when it was again captured by the Omanis and used as a barracks, before its occupation by the British in 1895, after the establishment of the East Africa Protectorate (which later became, in 1920, the Colony and Protectorate of Kenya).

== Preservation and legacy ==
In 1958, Fort Jesus was declared a national museum. In 2011, it was declared a World Heritage Site by UNESCO and highlighted as one of the most outstanding and well-preserved examples of 16th-century Portuguese military fortifications. The fort is Mombasa's most visited tourist attraction.

== Overview ==
Between 1631 and 1875, the fort was won and lost nine times by the nations contesting control of Kenya. The Omanis took the fort in 1698 after a notable siege of almost three years. It was declared a historical monument in 1958. Today it houses a museum.

The fort was designed by a Milanese architect, Giovanni Battista Cairati, who was the Chief Architect for Portuguese possessions in the East. It was the first European-style fort constructed outside of Europe designed to resist cannon fire. Today, it is one of the finest examples of 16th-century Portuguese military architecture, which has been influenced and changed by both the Omani Arabs and the British. The fort quickly became a vital possession for anyone with the intention of controlling Mombasa Island or the surrounding areas of trade. When the British colonized Kenya, they used it as a prison, until 1958, when they converted it into a historical monument. James Kirkman was then assigned to excavate the monument, which he did (with a large use of external historical documents) from 1958 to 1971.

The architecture of the fort represents the rough outline of a person lying on their back, with their head towards the sea. The height of the walls is 18 meters. The original Portuguese fort had a height of 15 meters, but the Oman Arabs added 3 meters upon capturing the fort.

The fort combines Portuguese, Arab, and British elements (these being the major powers that held it at different times in history). The Portuguese and British presence is preserved in the presence of their respective cannons. The Portuguese cannons had a range of 200 meters and were longer than the British cannons, which had a range of 300 meters. Oman Arabs marked their occupancy with numerous inscriptions from the Koran on the wooden door posts and ceiling beams. The Muslim tradition of five pillars is also portrayed throughout the fort, with a former meeting hall supported by five stone pillars to the ceiling.

Some of the historical structures still standing in the fort include Oman House, which was the house of the sultan who governed the East African coast. Others are an open water cistern by the Portuguese for harvesting rainwater, and a 76-foot deep well sunk by the Arabs (but its water was too salty to be used for anything but washing).

The fort was declared a World Heritage site by UNESCO in 2011.

== Current status ==
Today, Fort Jesus is a popular destination for foreign and local tourists and serves as a tourist destination, the fort is important as a host for numerous research programs, a Conservation Lab, an Education Department, and an Old Town Conservation Office.

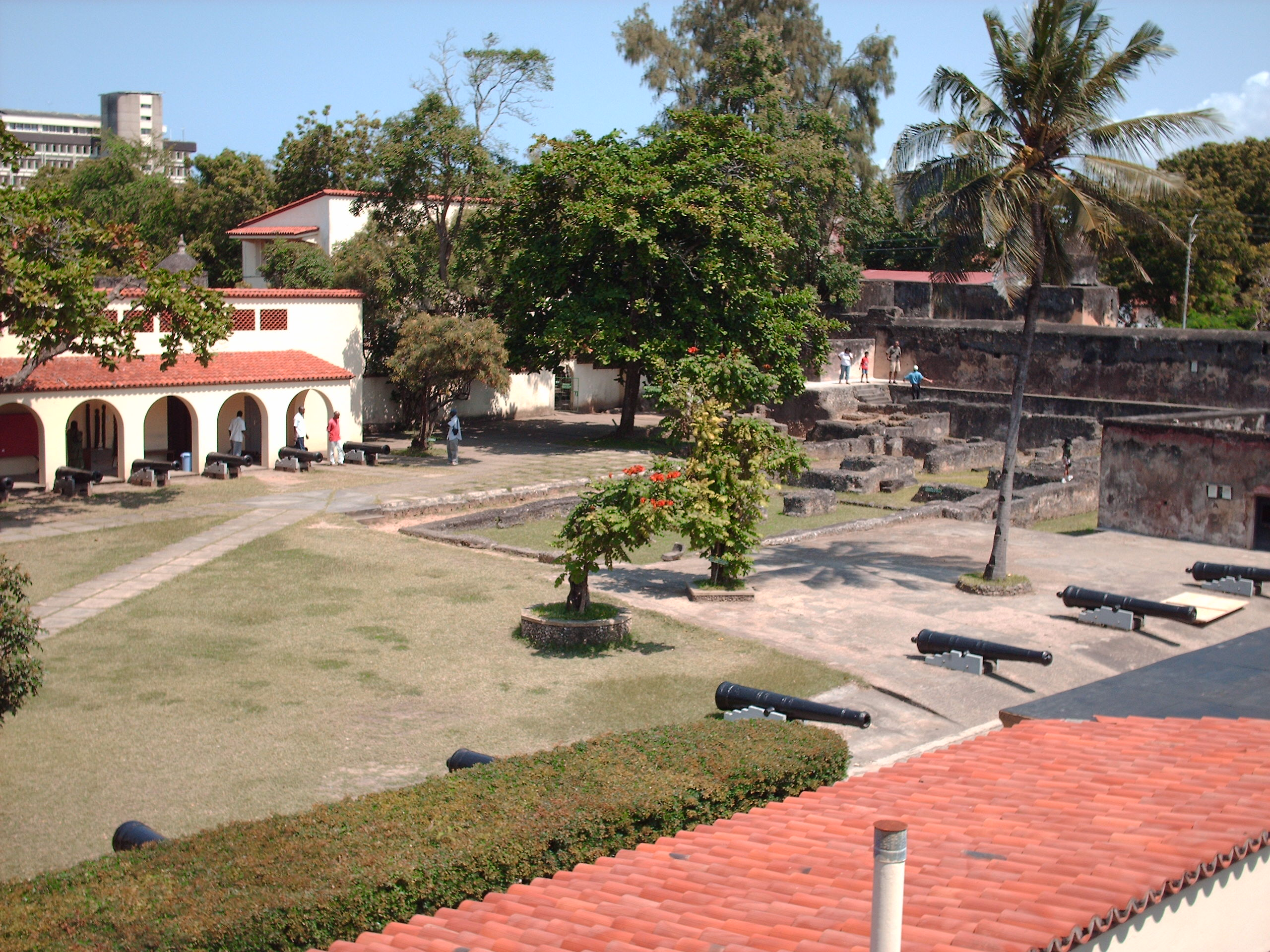
Interior

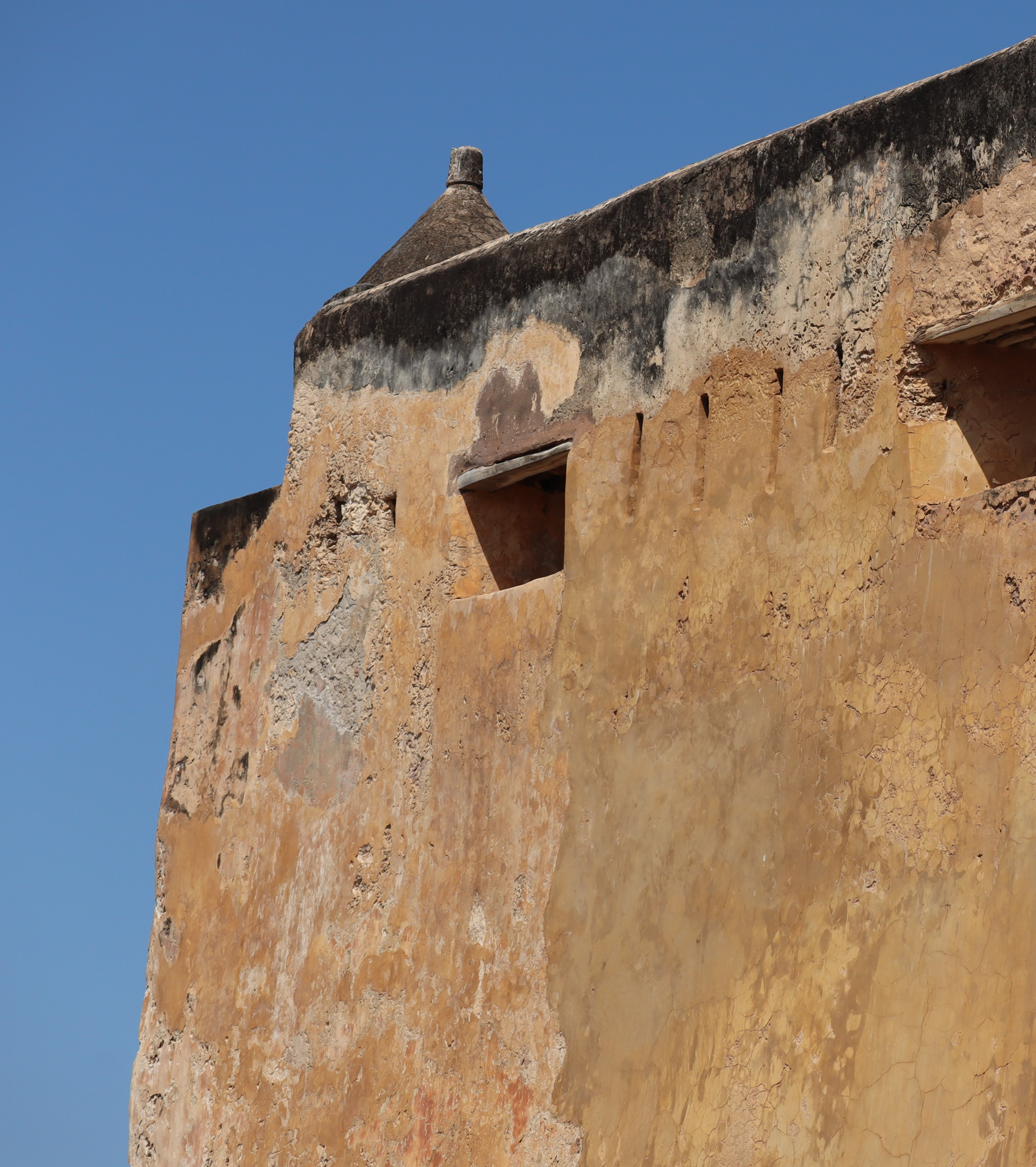
Outer wall

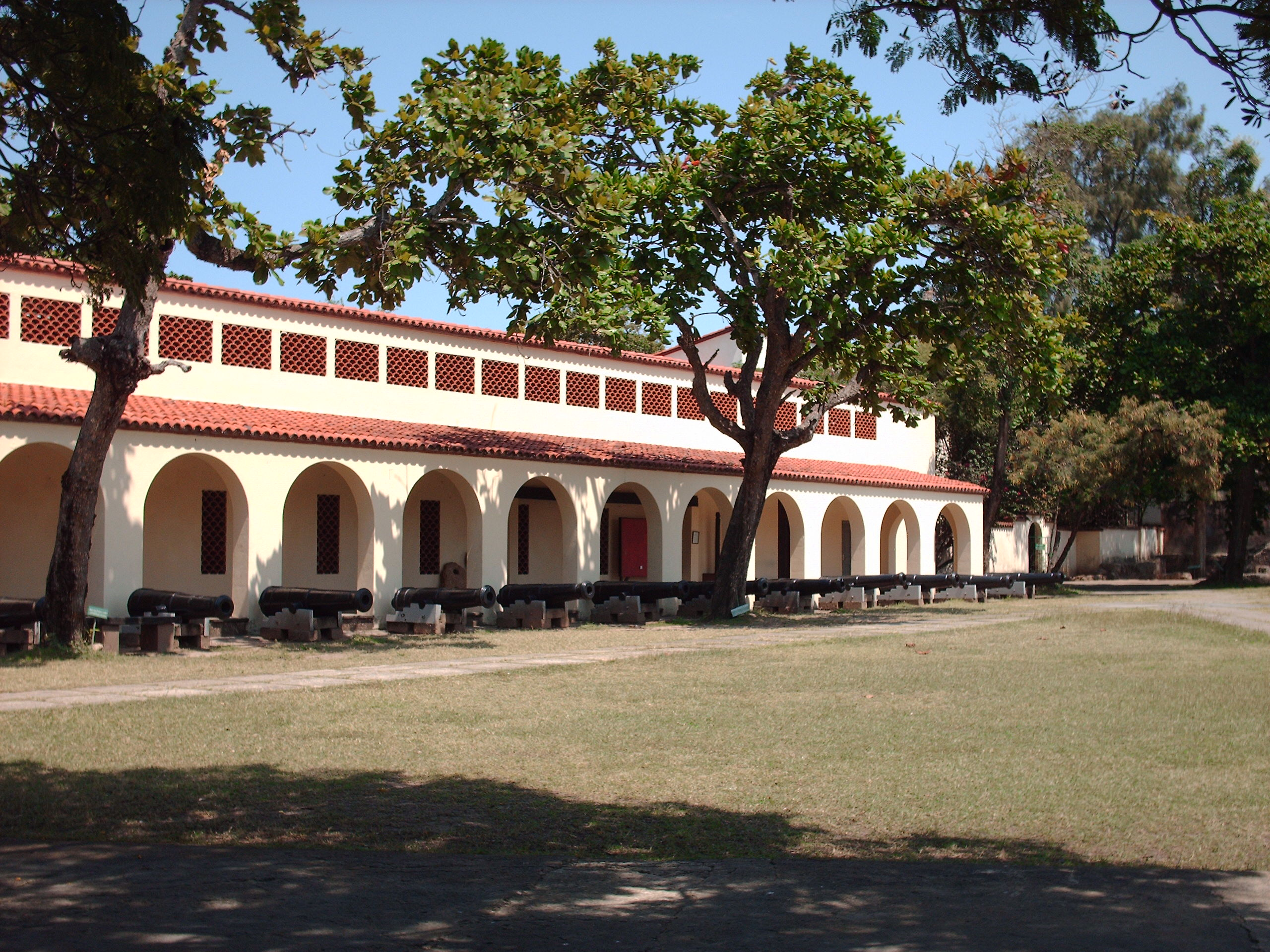
Building inside the fort

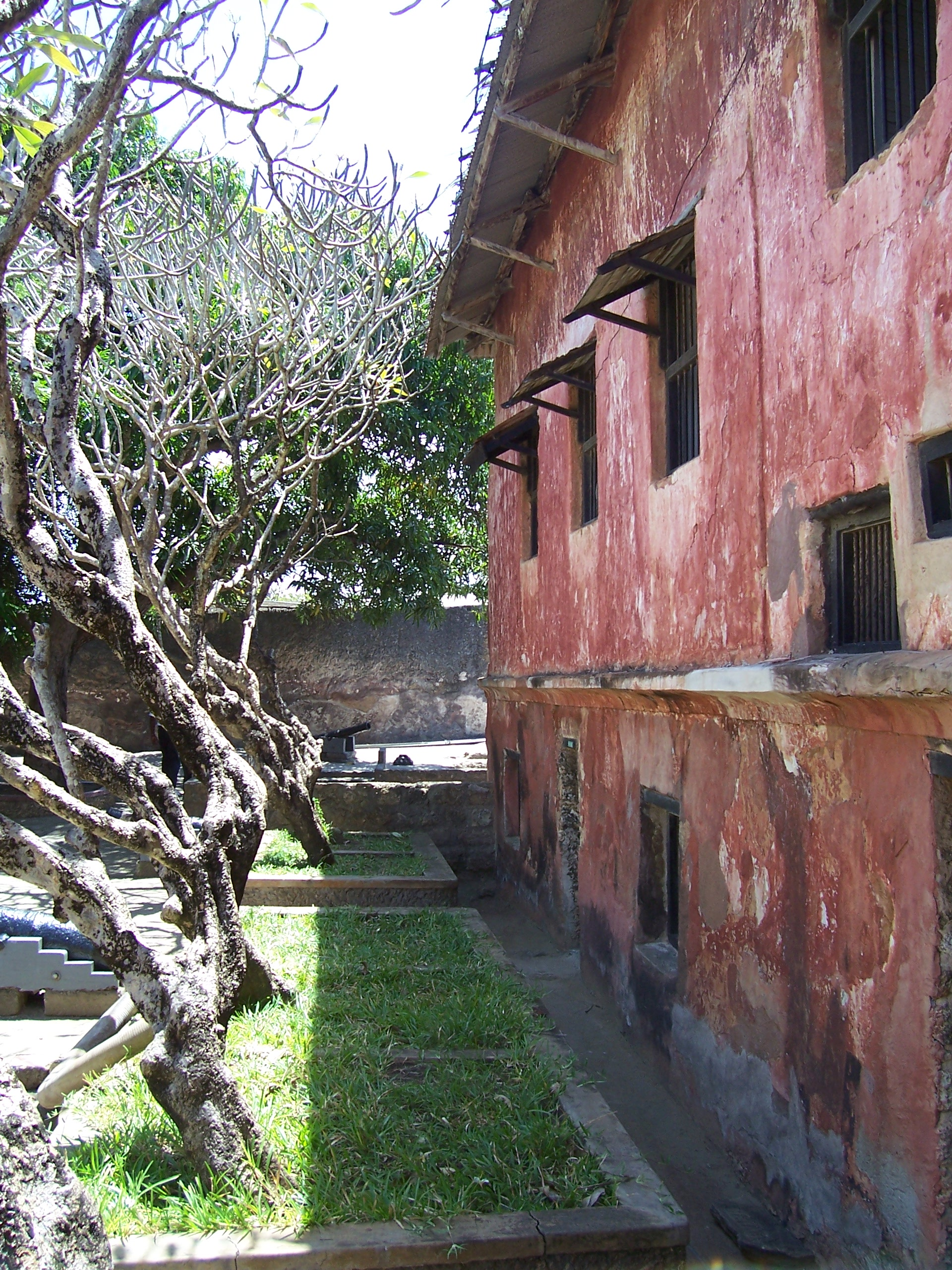
Windows of the inner buildings

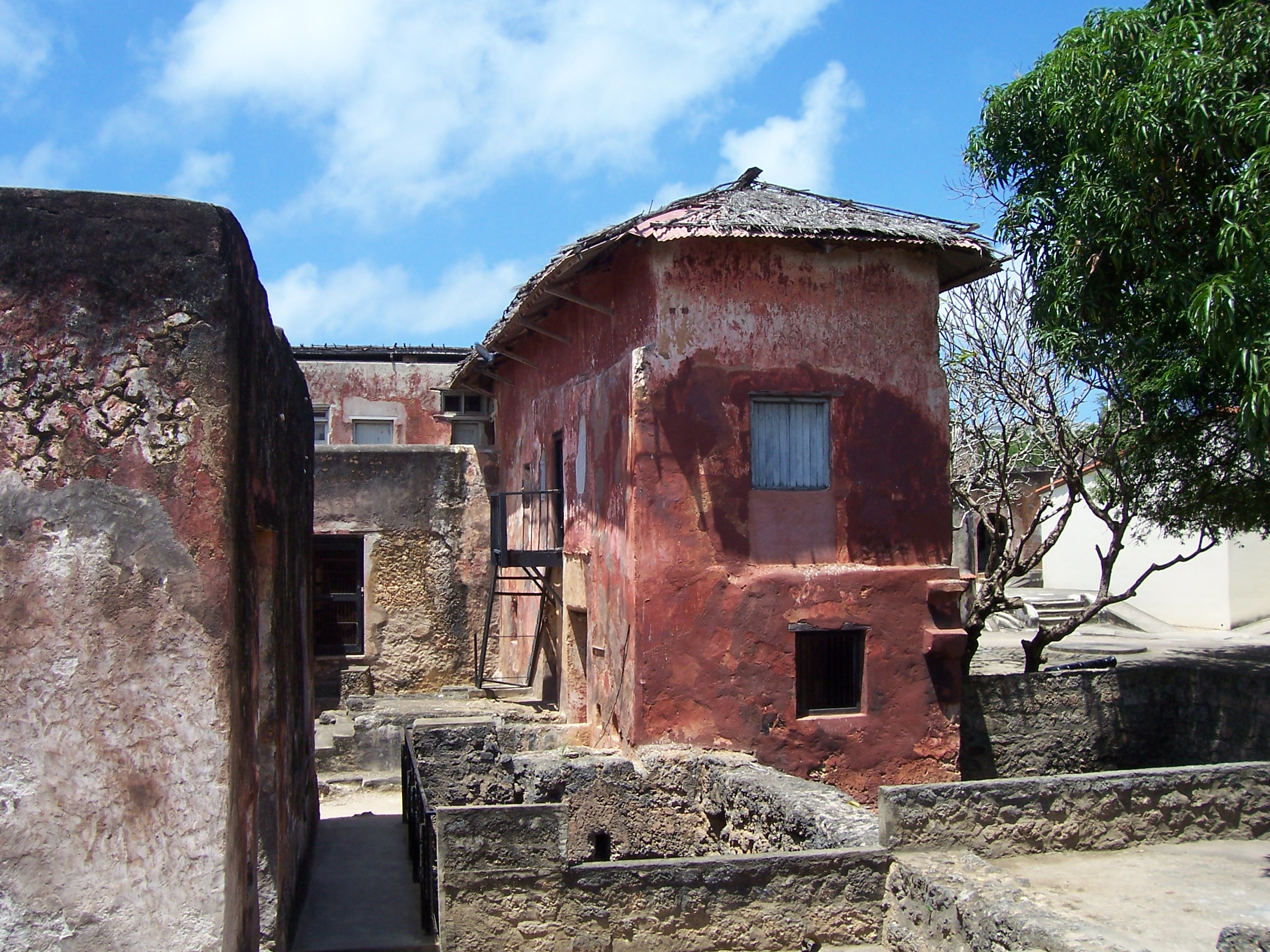
Juxtaposition of decayed and survived

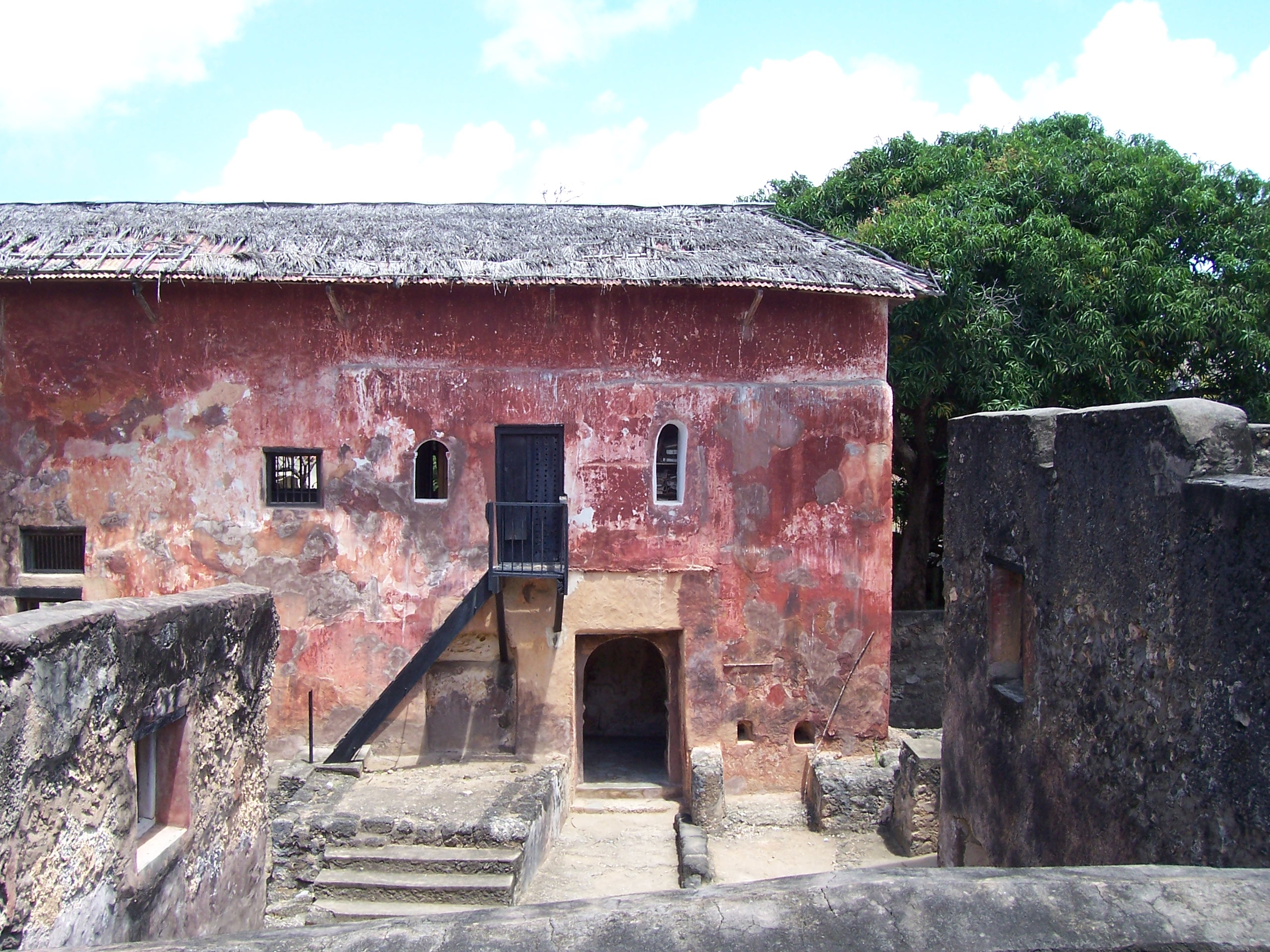
Obvious influence of Portuguese architecture
