= Makupa Causeway =

- Coordinates: 4°01′59″S 39°39′02″E
- Carries: A109 trunk road, Uganda Railway

Characteristics
- Total length: 1.5 miles (2.4 km)

The Makupa Causeway (Swahili pronunciation: [maˈkupa]) is a causeway linking Mombasa island to the Kenyan mainland. The road runs for approximately one and a half miles between the Magongo Circus and Makupa Circus. The causeway dissects Tudor Creek to the east and Port Reitz Creek to the west.

The causeway is one of three road links between the island and the Kenyan mainland – the other two being the Nyali Bridge and the Kipevu Causeway.

== Function ==
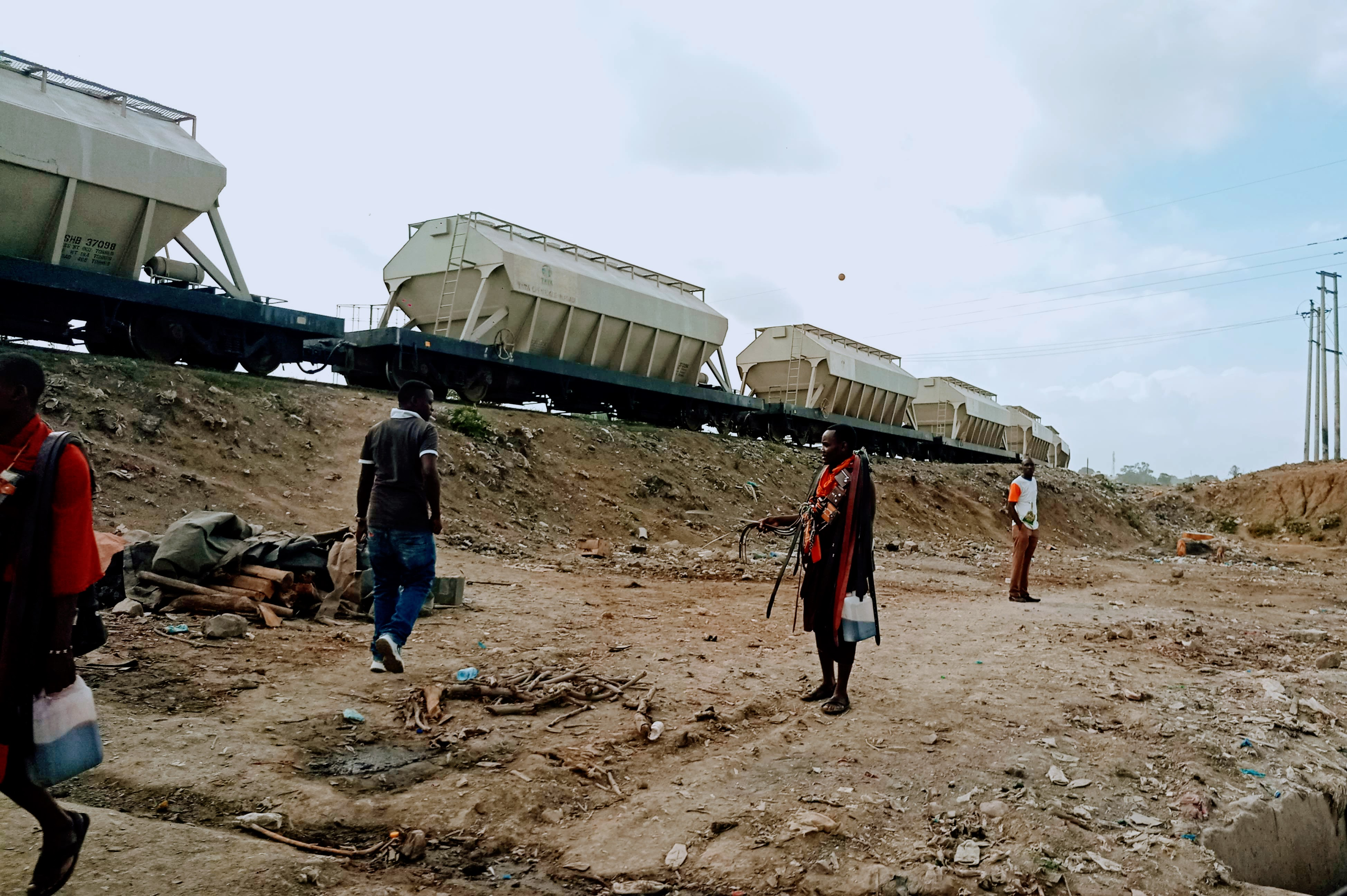
A freight train en route to the port of Mombasa passes through Makupa Causeway.

The causeway is a dual-purpose transport corridor that carries a trunk road (serving the main A109 Mombasa-Nairobi road route) and the Uganda Railway. The road is split into a two-level route (the south-bound carriageway is elevated on an embankment) and traffic is restricted to fifty miles per hour. The road serves few businesses except a large waste disposal site in the Kipevu district. In 2008, the area was the site of a considerable toxic waste leak.

== History ==
Built in 1929 by the Colonial British Government, the causeway replaced the Britannia Bridge which had been completed in 1899. In addition to the rail crossing, the causeway incorporated a road crossing. It was originally called the Macupa Causeway. It spans approximately 1200 ft (365m).

== Checkpoint ==
The south end of the causeway is the site of an armed police checkpoint. This is primarily for immigration purposes, but also functions as a traffic policing location.

== See also ==
- Makupa Causeway Bridge
