= Mombasa Island =

Island in Kenya

Mombasa
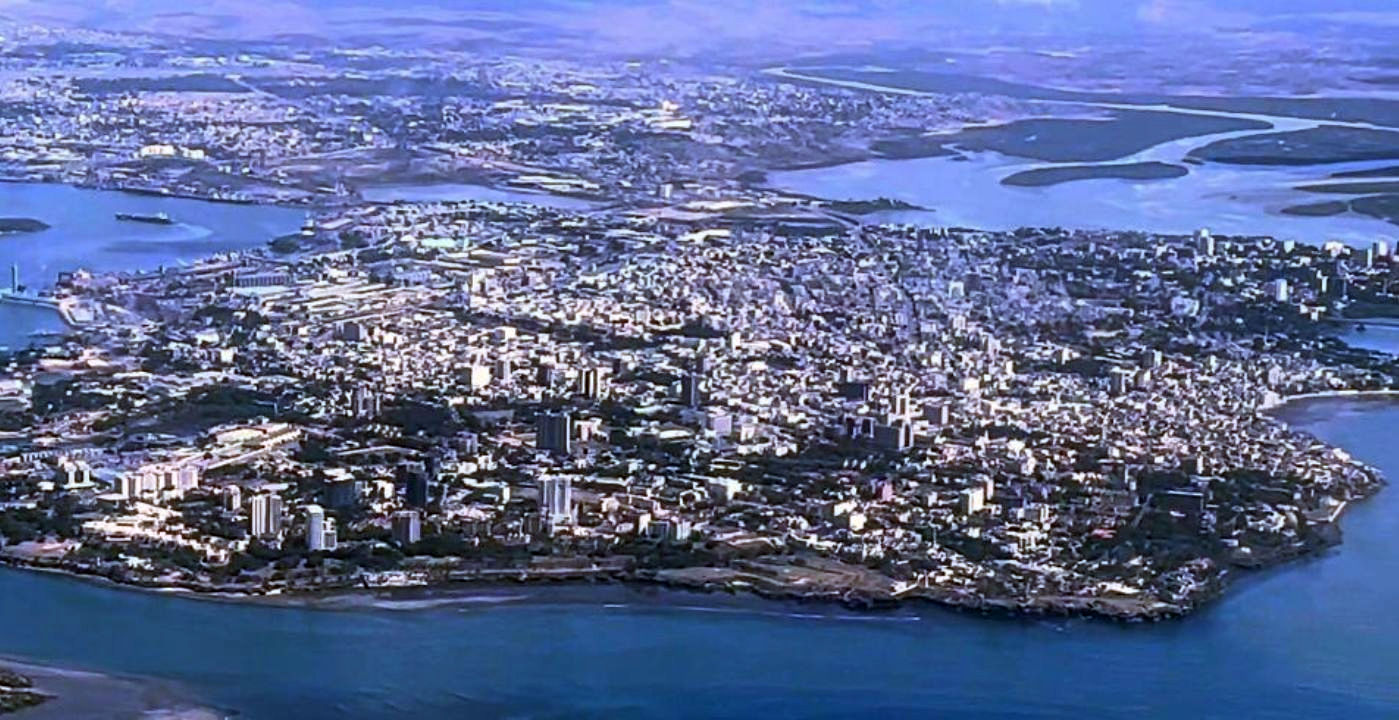
- View of Mombasa Island

- Location within Kenya

Geography
- Location: Indian Ocean
- Coordinates: 4°3′S 39°40′E
- Area: 5.3 km^{2} (2.0 sq mi)
- Length: 5 km (3.1 mi)
- Width: 3 km (1.9 mi)

Administration
- Kenya
- Largest settlement: Mombasa

Demographics
- Population: 146,334 (1999)

Mombasa Island is a 5 by 3 km (3.1 by 1.9 mi) coral outcrop located on Kenya's coast on the Indian Ocean, which is connected to the mainland by a causeway. Part of the city of Mombasa is located on the island, including the Old Town.

== History ==
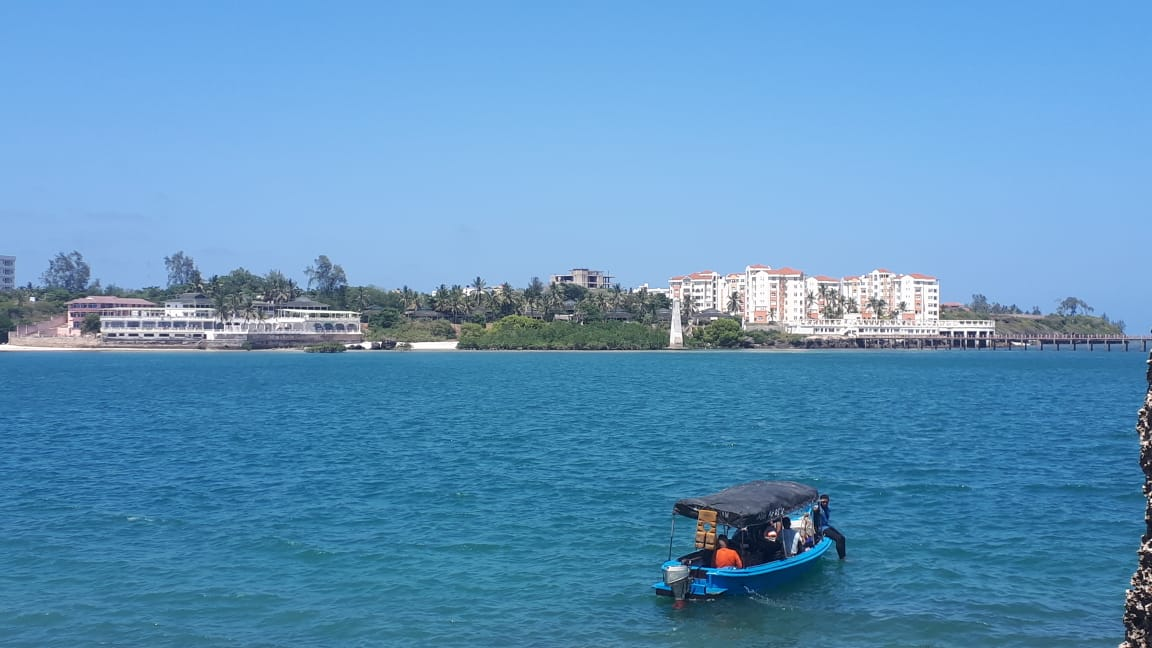
Boat leaving the island near Fort Jesus and heading to Nyali

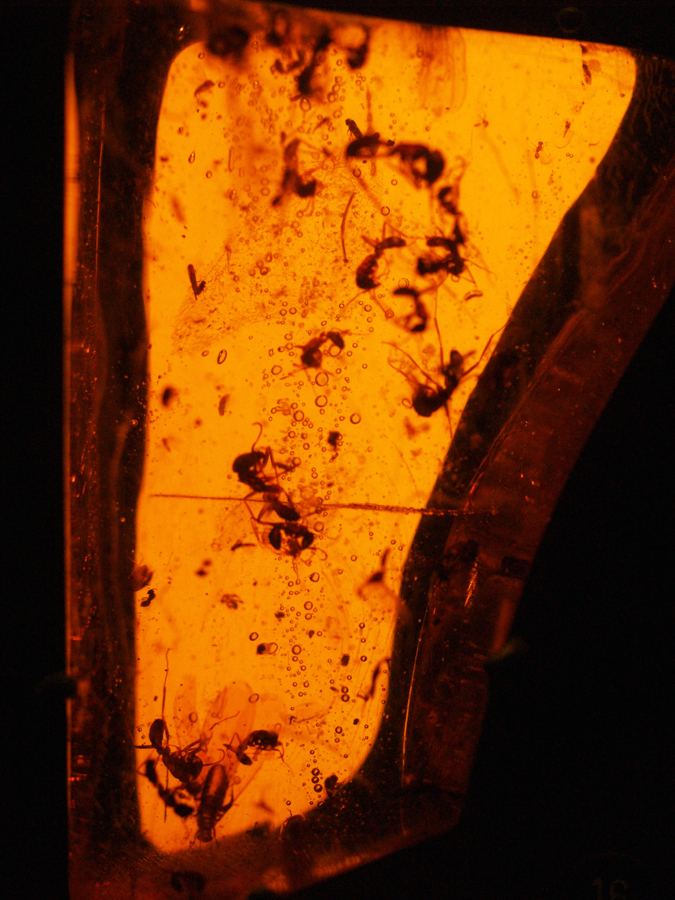
Ants in amber, found on Mombasa Island, on display at the Houston Museum of Natural Science.

The old town of Mombasa is located at the eastern, seaward end of the island. Kilindini and Port Reitz, the modern deepwater harbour and port separates the island from the Kenyan mainland to the south. The old harbour, which is named Port Tudor and guarded by Fort Jesus, and Tudor Creek separate the island from the northern mainland. Modern residential sprawl and industrial areas now occupy the rest of the island.

Mombasa is linked to the mainland by the Makupa Causeway to the northwest, by the Nyali Bridge to the east and by the Likoni Ferry to the south. A road and rail bridge also serve the mainland container port near Port Reitz.

Port Tudor and Tudor Creek were named by Owen Tudor the Royal Navy captain who first surveyed the area.

== Geography ==
Mombasa Island is one of the four divisions of Mombasa County. The division has a population of 1,208,333 (2019 census). It is divided into six subdivisions:

- Ganjoni
- Railway
- Tononoka
- Tudor
- Majengo
- Old Town

== See also ==
- Timeline of Mombasa history
