= Magongo, Kenya =

Magongo
- Location in Kenya
- Coordinates: 3°51′S 39°14′E
- Country: Kenya
- County: Mombasa County
- Time zone: UTC+1 (EAT)

Magongo is a town in Mombasa County, Kenya. It is an outlying township 10 minutes northwest of Mombasa Island, situated on the Nairobi road. Magongo is found in Changamwe constituency which is regarded as the richest constituency in Mombasa county when bearing in mind the Kenya Ports Authority (KPA) which is the biggest employer in the county is found, also major infrastructures such as the Moi International Airport and the SGR train are all located here.

Magongo used to be a low income area but recent infrastructure development such as road expansions and even a mall plus a major supermarket have changed the shape of the area. Whereas years ago only Swahili buildings dominated the area, now apartment blocks are popping out from every corner.

Magongo is also home to the Akamba Handicraft Cooperative.

The town was referenced in the 2009 video game Halo 3: ODST as a destination of the New Mombasa transit system.

thumb
