= Yusuf ibn al-Hasan =

Yusuf ibn al-Hasan (c. 1607 – c. 1640), christened Dom Jerónimo Chingulia, was ruler of Mombasa from 1614 to 1632.

== Biography ==
=== Yusuf's father ===
The old sultan died around 1609 and was succeeded by his son Hasan, who continued to assert his claim to Pemba, offering the Portuguese 300 bales of rice as a privilege. Relations between the Sultan of Mombasa and the Portuguese deteriorated, particularly between 1611 and 1612. An obnoxious Portuguese captain seized power, demanding more rice sacks from Pemba as payment, and feuds within the Sultan's family caused serious trouble in Mombasa. King Munganaja's uncle (Mwini Nasr) quarreled with Hasan. He went to the captain of Fort Jesús and told him that Hassan was planning a rebellion and was joining forces with his neighboring tribe, the Mussungoro, to overthrow the Portuguese. When questioned, Hasan claimed his innocence, but the Portuguese did not believe him.

They attacked his palace and appointed Munganaja as interim regent. Hasan left Mombasa and settled in Kilifi, but returned after a faltering ceasefire. Relations between the Portuguese and the Sultan continued to deteriorate until 1614, when a Portuguese ship arrived, and he attempted to bring Hasan to Goa for questioning. When he learned that he was about to be arrested, Hasan fled to his ally Musongoro's fortress (kaya) at Labai on the mainland. However, the African tribesmen succumbed to the Portuguese's bribe of 2,000 pieces of cloth, betrayed and murdered him, and left his body at the Machpa crossing as evidence of the crime. The captain ordered his head cut off and sent to Goa as a miserable trophy.

=== Early life ===
In Goa, news of the assassination was met with dismay. Sultan Hassan had been summoned to Goa to plead guilty, and the murder was not the intended result, Hasan's brother became the ruler of Mombasa instead, and Hasan's son Yusuf, an 11-year-old boy, was taken to Goa to be raised as a Christian. The governor personally acted as the boy's godfather, and his child support was paid out of the state treasury. When the case was finally brought before a Portuguese court in 1618, the Sultan was acquitted of treason. The murdered man's loyalty was wrongfully questioned, and his son was declared the rightful heir to the Mombasa throne. However, the Portuguese governor of Mombasa escaped punishment.

Don Jeronimo Chingulia, renamed Yusuf, was educated at the Monastery of Our Lady of Mercy in Goa under the auspices of the Augustinian Order. He was under the viceroy's watch and trained for his role as king. In 1627, in a special ceremony in Goa, he was crowned King of Mombasa, Malindi, and Pemba, and after swearing obedience to the Pope, he was knighted in the Order of Christ. He then traveled to Mombasa and was crowned king.

=== Capture of Mombasa and massacre ===
According to Portuguese accounts, Yusuf ibn al-Hasan began secretly visiting his father's grave at night and praying in the Islamic manner. A Portuguese informant reportedly observed this and warned the captain of Fort Jesus, but later informed Yusuf that his conduct had become known to the Portuguese authorities. Yusuf is said to have thanked the man for the warning, promised him a reward, and then had him killed.

On 15 August 1631, the Feast of the Assumption of Mary, Yusuf gathered about 300 followers and entered the fort under the pretence of taking part in the celebrations. The captain, Pedro Leitão de Gamboa, received him without suspicion. Yusuf then killed the captain, and his followers attacked the Portuguese in the fort, taking them by surprise and seizing control of both the fortress and the town.

Yusuf and his followers then attacked the Portuguese residential quarters. Some inhabitants fled to the Augustinian monastery, where they remained for several days before surrendering after their supplies were exhausted. They were subsequently killed. More than 150 Portuguese men, women, and children were killed in the violence. Four Augustinian friars and one layman reportedly escaped by boat to Pate. The victims later came to be known as the Martyrs of Mombasa.

=== Portuguese expedition to Mombasa 1632 ===
In mid-December 1631, a Portuguese fleet of 20 ships and 1,000 men was sent to Mombasa in retaliation. As funds were tight, funding for these ships became a problem, and the usual trade expedition to Ceylon was canceled that year. The ship first called at Pate to gather information and arrived in Mombasa. In January 1632, others from Zanzibar and Muscat joined them to avenge Yusuf's crimes, no doubt enjoying the booty. Yusuf was well prepared, summoning his neighboring tribesmen, the Musungoro, and fortifying their fortresses. His efforts to win the Turks over to his side were unsuccessful, but the Turks sent him a flag, and he hoped that the Turks' presence would be enough to hold off the Portuguese. He raised his banner over the fortress. The Portuguese first attempted to blockade the island by sending boats to nail the fords to Machpa. On 16 January they decided to land troops at Tuaca (Mbaraki in the southwest of the island, then called Nossa Senhora or Tuaca), but heavy seas made the landing impossible.

Another landing attempt was repulsed at Kilindini, and more bases were lost to poisoned arrows by Mussungoro archers. On March 11, Portuguese forces landed at a site called the Turkish Fortress, opposite the mainland fortifications. Despite this new foundation, nothing was achieved. As the monsoon was changing, it was finally decided on March 15 to lift the siege, withdraw, and return to Goa.

=== Death ===
Yusuf then left Mombassa and became a pirate. In 1637 there is one final reference to him at the island of Amissa off Cape Delgado, where he failed to make a surprise raid. He is then supposed to have gone to Shihr in Eastern Yemen to pick up another ship. He died in November 1638 robbed and murdered in the Red Sea by Arab pirates.

== Literature ==
- Aldrick, Judy, The Sad Story of Dom Jeronimo, the Last Swahili Sultan of Mombasa, Academia.
- Hall, Richard, Empires of the monsoon : a history of the Indian Ocean and its invaders, pp. 270–80 – via Archive.
