= Tudor Creek =

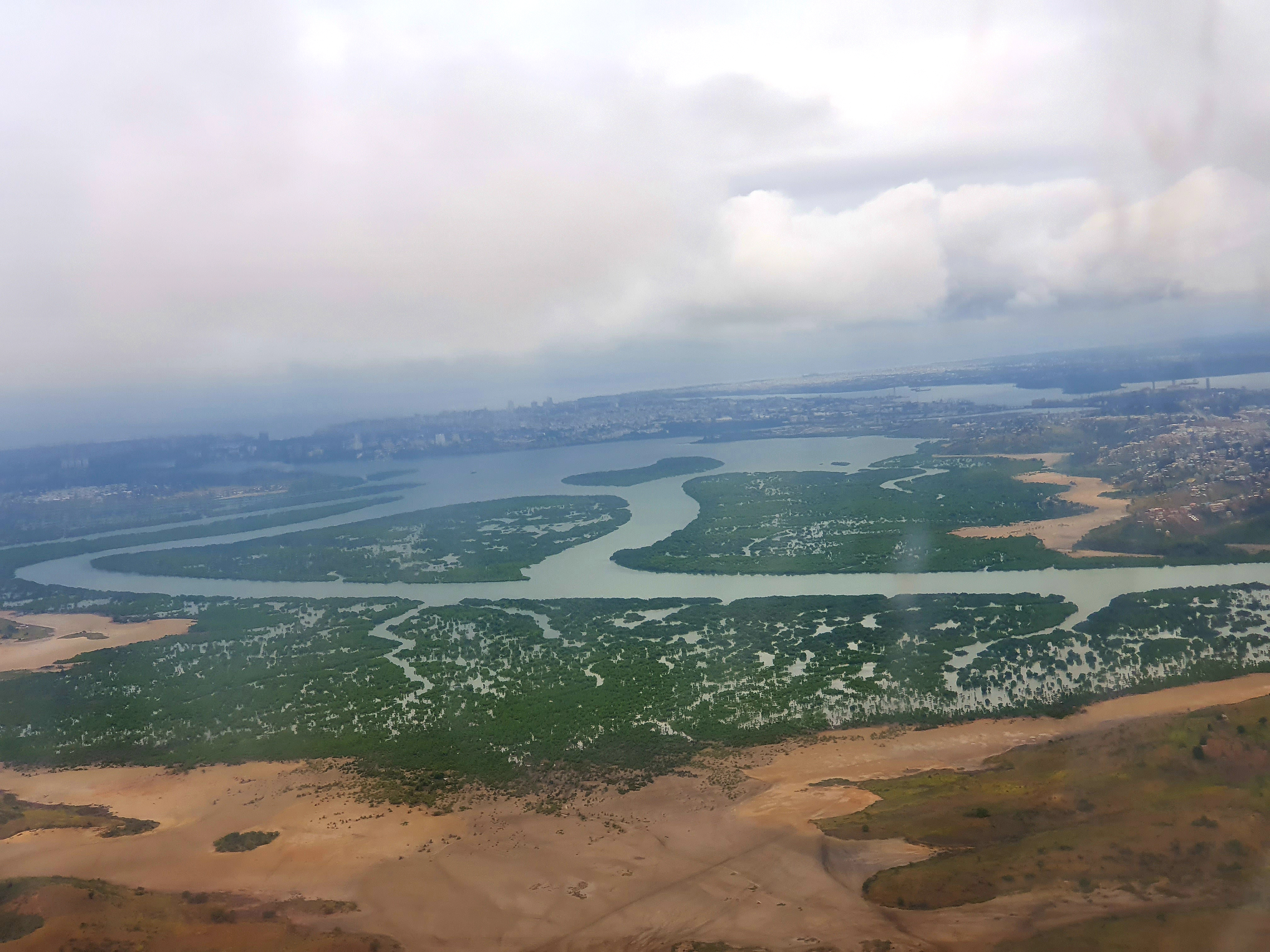
- Tudor Creek from the air

Location
- Country: Kenya

Physical characteristics
- Source
  - location: Mariakani
- Mouth
  - location: Mombasa /; Indian Ocean
  - coordinates: 4°03′51″S 39°41′03″E
  - elevation: 0 metres (0 ft)

Tudor Creek is one of two main water bodies separating Mombasa Island (and the city of Mombasa) from the Kenyan mainland (the other body being Kilindini Harbour).

Before the estuary into the Indian Ocean, the tidal creek passes under the Nyali Bridge, and is bordered to the west by the Makupa Causeway.

The source of the river that becomes the creek is near the town of Mariakani, approximately 20 miles (32 km) north-west of Mombasa.
