= Port Reitz =

- Location within Kenya
- Coordinates: 4°2′19″S 39°36′17″E
- Country: Kenya
- County: Mombasa County
- Time zone: UTC+3 (EAT)

Port Reitz (/ˌpɔːrˈtriːs/; alternatively spelled Portreitz) is a district of Mombasa, Kenya, and is located north-west of the island. It was named after Lieutenant J. J. Reitz, an officer in the Royal Navy, who became commander or resident of Mombasa in February 1824.

== Mombasa Airport ==
Port Reitz is the location of Moi International Airport, the second largest airport in Kenya. The dual-runway airport was originally named Port Reitz Airport.

== Port Reitz Hospital ==
At the end of the main Port Reitz road is the Port Reitz District Hospital. The hospital operates a mental institute, a children's hospital and prosthetics centre. A funeral director is located opposite the hospital complex. The road leading to the complex has come under political criticism due to the neglect of upkeep.

== Transport ==
Port Reitz is reached by matatu from Mombasa island. Although Port Reitz is a matatu terminus, shared taxis to Migadini are within walking distance.
