= Nyali Bridge =

Girder bridge in Kenya

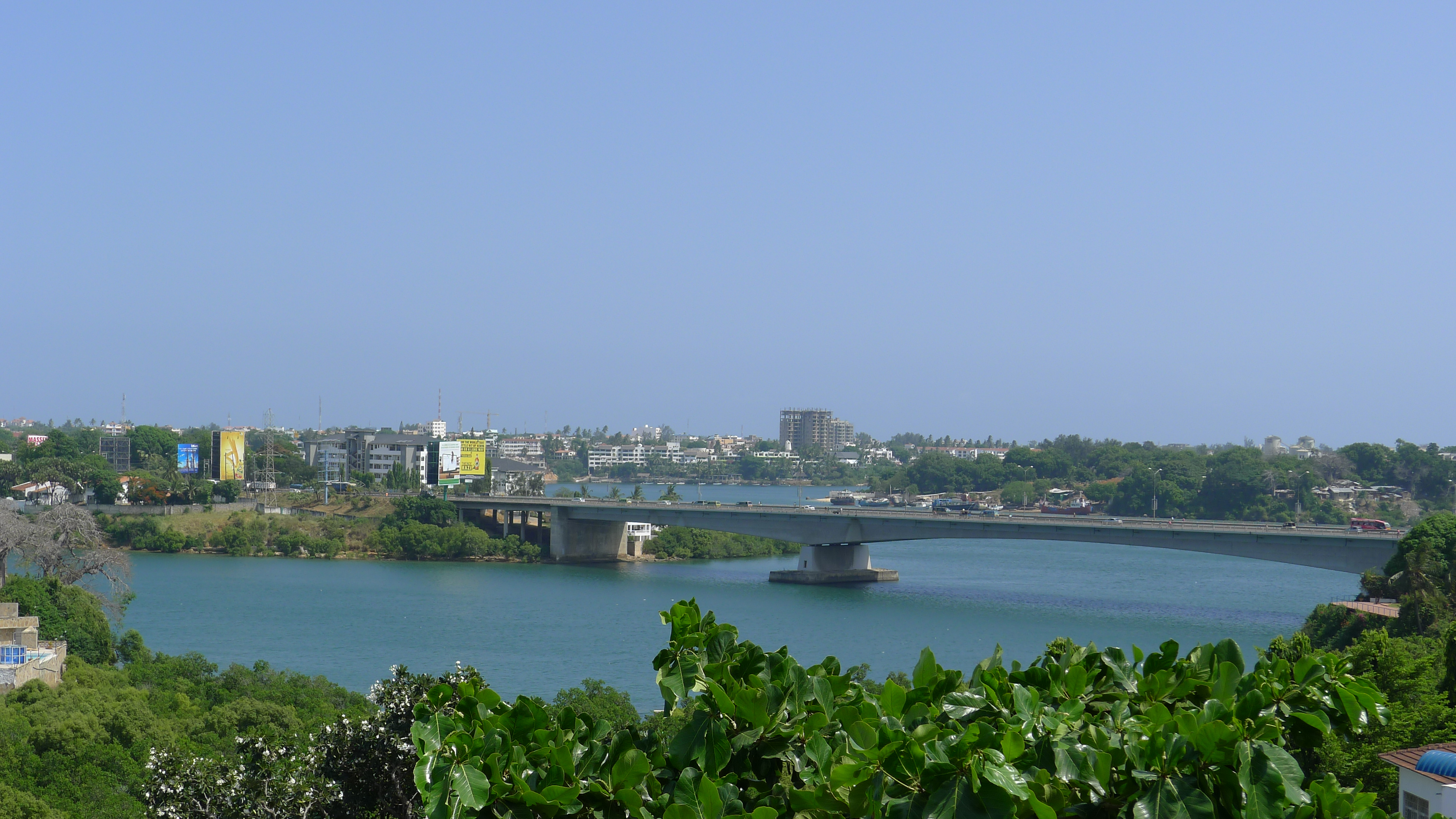
- Coordinates: 4°2′34″S 39°40′21″E
- Carries: Road traffic, pedestrians
- Crosses: Tudor Creek
- Locale: Kenya

Characteristics
- Design: concrete girder bridge
- Total length: 1,300 ft (400 m)
- Longest span: 500 ft (150 m)

History
- Opened: 1980

Location
- Interactive map of Nyali Bridge

The Nyali Bridge is a concrete girder bridge connecting the city of Mombasa on Mombasa Island to the mainland of Kenya and located on B8 road. The bridge crosses Tudor Creek (a tidal inlet) to the north-east of the island. The bridge is one of three road links out of Mombasa (the others being the Kipevu and Makupa Causeways). The Likoni Ferry provides a third transport link to the island, and is situated at the southern tip. The mainland approach to the bridge serves as a police checkpoint in both directions.

== Cost ==
The Old Nyali Bridge (a floating bridge) stood approximately 800 m downstream from the current crossing.

The floating bridge was commissioned by Governor Joseph Byrne in 1931.

== Details ==
It is 391.65 metres long and 26.3 metres wide with a total of six lanes. The main bridge is 330 metres prestressed continuous box girder over three spans with the centre span of 150 metres. The outer spans are 90 metres each. The bridge is founded on piled foundation. The newer Nyali Bridge includes an approach bridge with three spans totalling 61.65 metres whose superstructure is simply reinforced concrete beams and deck. Since its completion in 1980, no periodic maintenance was done to the bridge until 2005 when major repairs to the bridge were carried out. The repairs included post tensioning the box girder and shear strengthening using crack sealing and use of steel plates on the internal face of the box girder.
