= Msambweni =

- Town and constituency
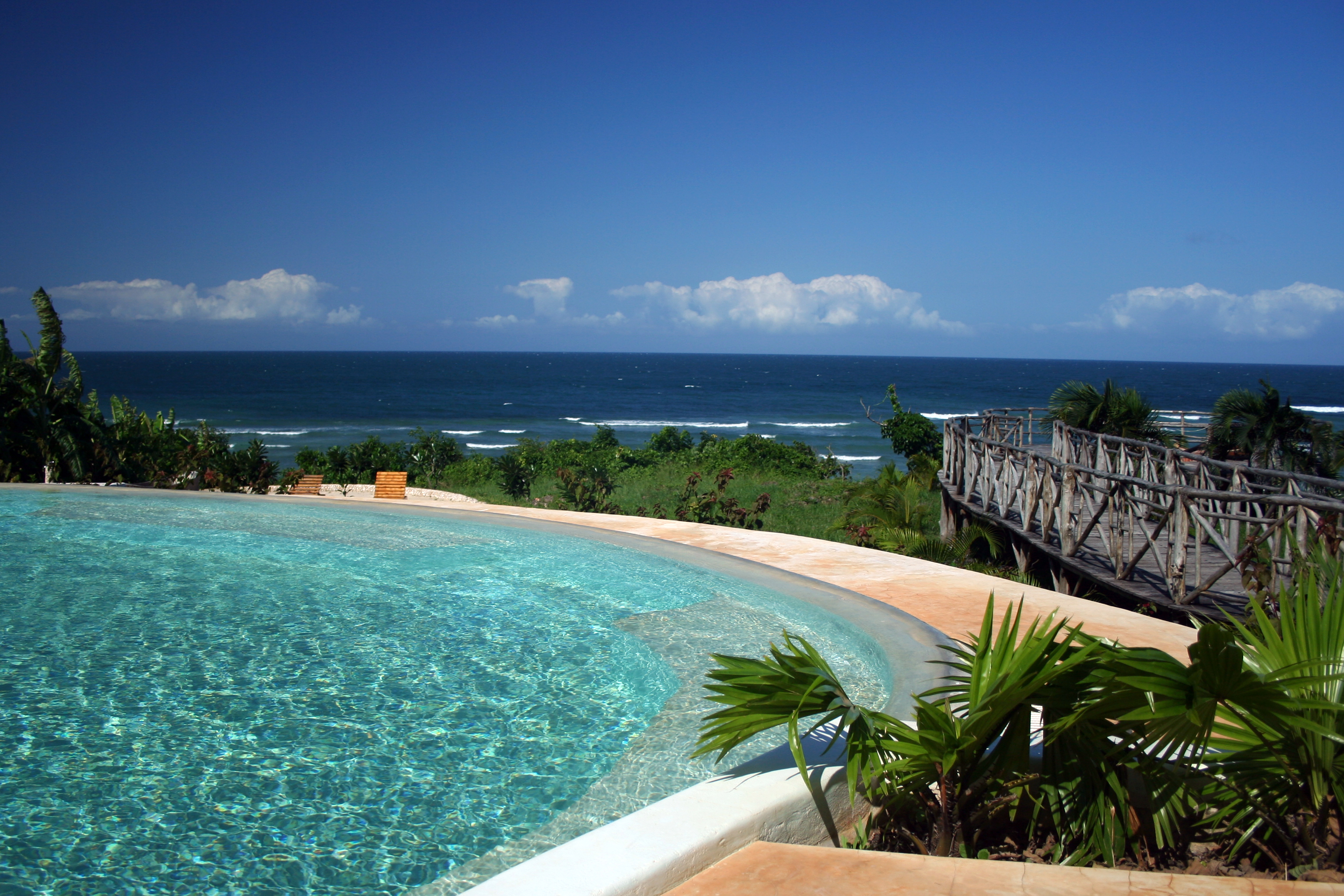
- View of the coast from Msambweni Beach Hotel

- Location within Kenya
- Coordinates: 4.47°S 39.48°E
- Country: Kenya
- Province: Coast
- County: Kwale
- Constituency: Msambweni

Population (2009)
  - Town and constituency: 11,985
  - Metro: 11,985
- Time zone: UTC+3 (EAT)

Msambweni (meaning "land of Msambwe" in Swahili) is a small fishing town and constituency in Kwale County of southeastern Kenya, formerly in Kwale District of Coast Province. The origin of the name, Msambwe (plural Misambwe) refers to a hardy and wild fruits (sambwe) tree indigenous to the area. A few remnants of the Msambwe trees are still existing at Mkunguni Beach, Sawa Sawa Village. By road, Msambweni is 55.4 kilometres (34.4 mi) south of Mombasa and 46.5 kilometres (28.9 mi) northeast of Lunga Lunga on the Tanzanian border. As of 2009, the town had a population of 11,985 people.

Fishing is the primary source of income, although coconut palm, buxa coloring, (Note: See Bixa orellana) cashew nuts and fruits are produced for trade. Because of its reef and extensive beaches, the snorkeling industry is gaining in popularity in Msambweni, and holiday cottages and hotels have sprung up in the area, such as the Msambweni Beach House. The town is noted for its leprosarium and contains the Msambweni District Hospital. The Koromojo Dam is immediately north of the town.

== Geography ==
By road, Msambweni is 55.4 kilometres (34.4 mi) south of Mombasa, 46.9 kilometres (29.1 mi) southeast of Kwale, and 46.5 kilometres (28.9 mi) northeast of Lunga Lunga on the Tanzanian border. It lies along the A14 road (Ukunda-Ramisi Road) between the villages of Ukunda and Shimoni.

Msambweni forms a constituency that starts from the Mwachema River at the border of Tiwi and Diani Beach to the north, and down to Ramisi River towards the border of Kenya and Tanzania to the south.

The area's scenery is characterized by its beaches, rocky outcrops and low cliff tops and is relatively unspoiled. At one end of the beach is a "rocky headland of fossilized coral, which is a jumble of cracks, caves and chimneys that make an ideal roost for bats" and there are baobab trees in the vicinity. There is a reef channel at Msambweni and aquifer which is about 25 kilometres (16 mi) south of the Tiwi aquifer. The reef, which stretches from Msambweni to Malindi in the north, is one of the world's largest continuous fringing reef. At the northern end of Msambweni Bay is Chale Island, a headland rather than an island, which is known as a sacred kaya (worshipping place). Many of the locals are superstitious and believe in witchcraft and spirits (jinis).

Bedrock in the area was likely formed by Mazeras Sandstones. Msambweni has an average rainfall of 55.18 inches a year.

== Politics ==
Msambweni Central forms a constituency with an elected Member of Parliament. As of 2001 the Msambweni Constituency had an area of 3,267 square kilometres (1,261 sq mi) with a population of 211,011 people. By 2009 it had a population of 288,393 people. Kassim Mwamzandi was MP from 1988–1997. The MP for Msambweni was Suleiman Dori Ramadhan until his death on 9 March 2020. He assumed office in 2013 and was re-elected in 2017. A by-election which was held towards the end of December 2020 was marginally won by independent candidate Feisal Bader.

== Economy ==
Msambweni grew from a small village into a bustling little town. Fishing is important to the local community of Msambweni and is the primary source of income. The area is mainly Muslim and inhabited by Digo peoples. The Kwake District Development Plan 2002–2008 attempted to improve fish landing sites and beach access for fisherman on the coast of Msambweni. Coconut palm is grown, as are cashew nuts, fruits and buxa coloring. Maize, cassava, cowpeas and rice are grown for domestic consumption. There are numerous stalls along the main road in the town selling fruit and vegetables. Silica sand is mined at Msambweni and transported to Nairobi to make bottle glass. Beekeeping and seaweed farming are also local occupation and its commercialization in the area has been supported by ACT! Kenya with financial assistance from the European Union.

A result of its reef, the tourist industry is taking off in Msambweni attracting snorkelers. Holiday cottages and hotels have sprung up. Club Green Oasis caters mainly to German tourists. Although supplied with electricity, in the 1990s the government expressed concerns about access to an ample clean water supply in the division.

== Landmarks ==
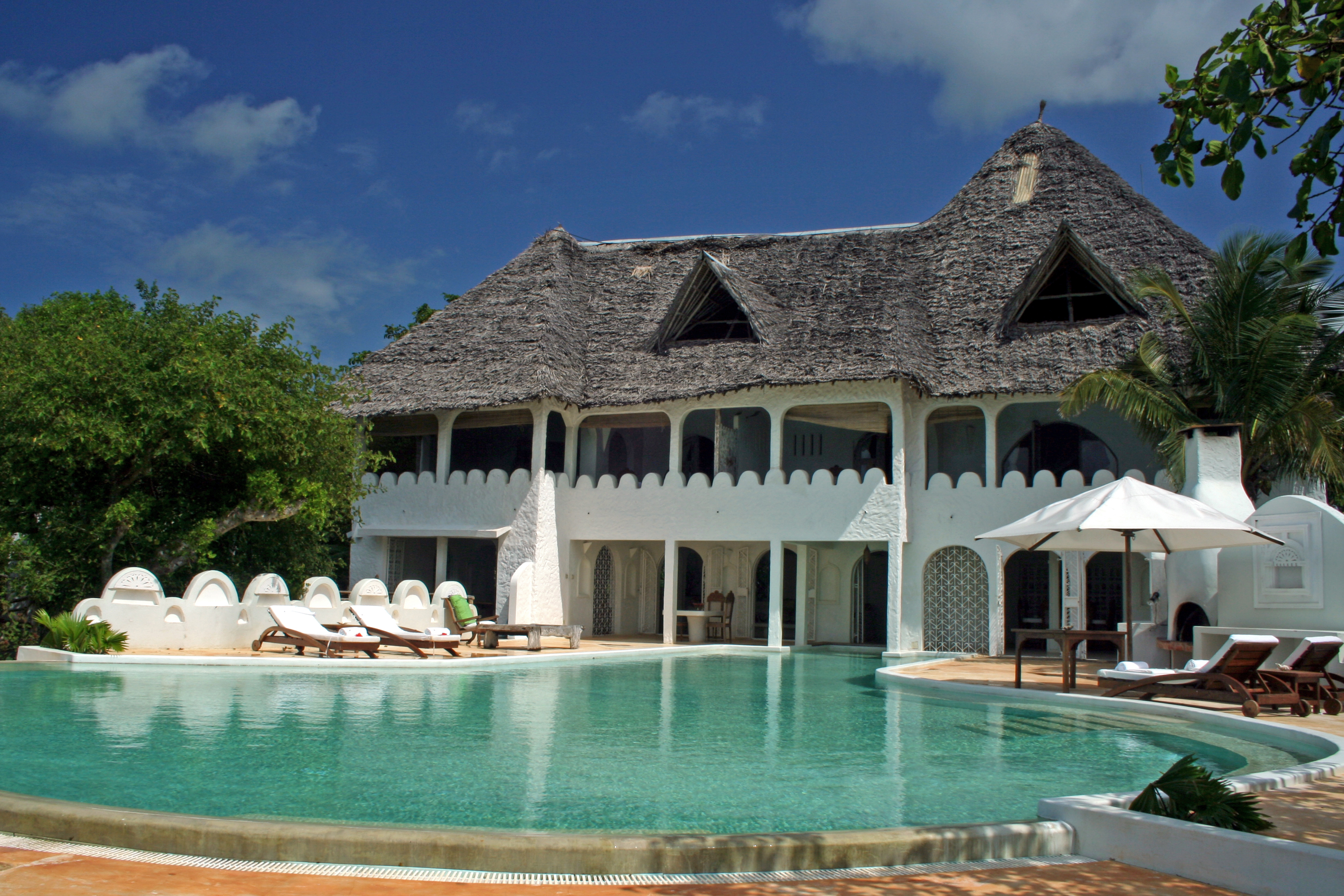
Msambweni Beach House

Msambweni is noted for its leprosarium, and contains the Msambweni Level 5 Hospital, which is reportedly one of the best hospitals on the coast, and Kari Medical Clinic, Vingujini Primary School, and Msambweni Secondary School. The Msambweni Campus of Kenya Medical Training College (KMTC), formerly the Matuga Medical Training College in Matuga, is located next to the hospital. It was established in 1977 and shifted location to Msambweni in August 2006. It trains students in the Health Sciences, and since 2005 they have offered a three and half-year pre-service diploma course in Community Health Nursing.

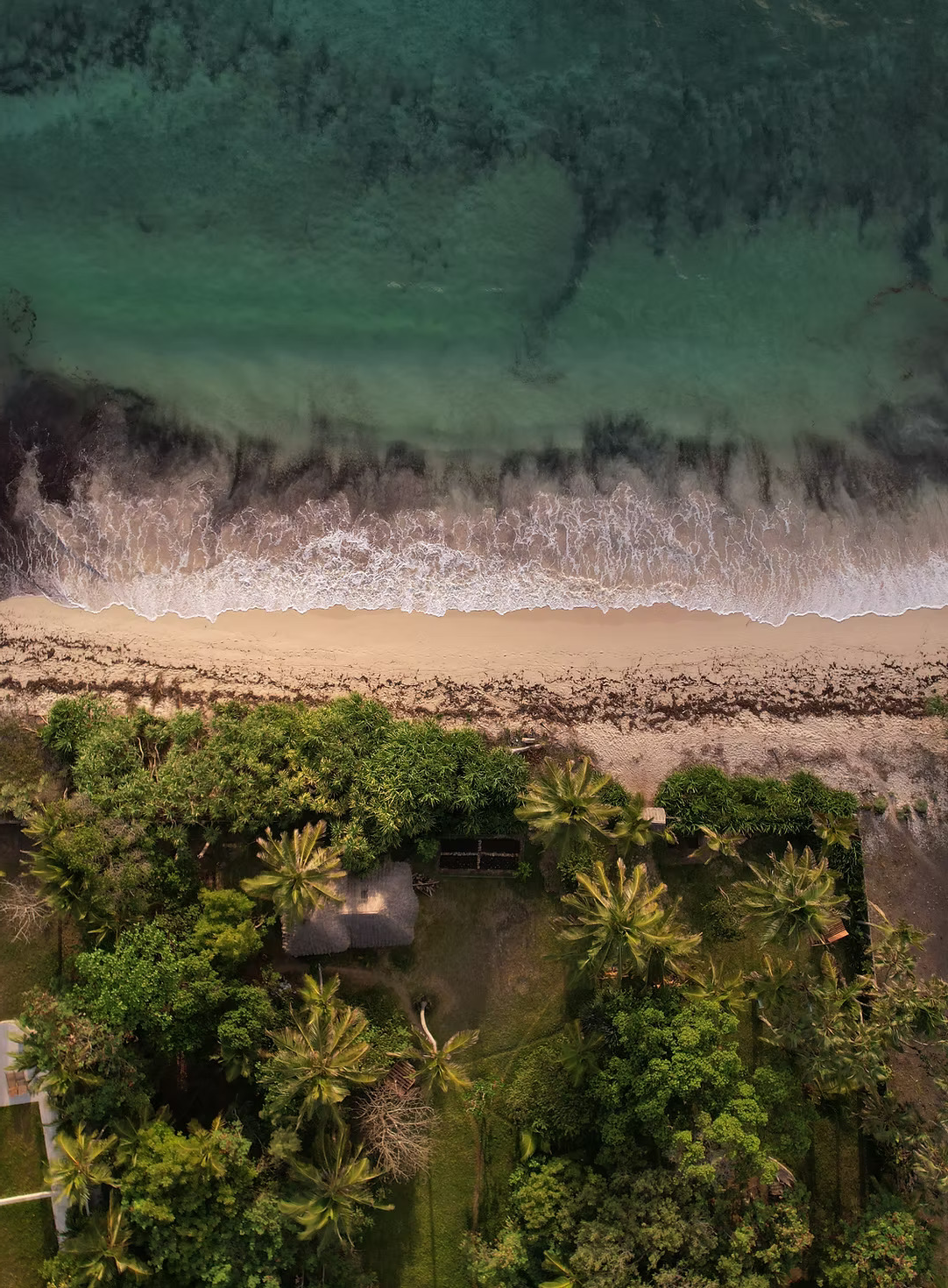
pristine Kaya Imani Beach & Indigenous Forest

On a 40 feet (12 m) clifftop is the Msambweni Beach House, set in 28 acres with a 700 feet (210 m) stretch of private beach. Nearby is Kaya Imani, a popular artistic, eco friendly, off-the-grid getaway destination by the beach which sits on a tranquil indigenous forest.

Although predominantly Muslim, the town has an interdenominational church. Immediately to the north of Msambweni is the Koromojo Dam. and between Msambweni and Kwale is the Shimba Hills National Reserve. There is a marine reserve at Shimoni beyond Funzi Island to the south.
