= Kwale International Sugar Company Limited =

Coordinates: 04°31′46″S 39°23′43″E

- Company type: Private
- Industry: Manufacture & Marketing of Sugar
- Founded: 2007
- Headquarters: Msambweni, Kwale County, Kenya
- Products: Sugar; Sugar marketing
- Website: kwale-group.com

Kwale International Sugar Company Limited (KISCOL), is a sugar manufacturer in Kenya.

== Location ==
The plantation and factory of KISCOL are located in Kwale County on the eastern coast of Kenya. This location, immediately south of the town of Kwale, along the Lunga-Lunga-Msambweni Road, is approximately 53 kilometres (33 mi), by road, southwest of Mombasa, the second-largest city in Kenya. The coordinates of the company factory are: 4°31'46.0"S, 39°23'43.0"E (Latitude:-4.529444; Longitude:39.395278).

== Overview ==
Kwale International Sugar Company Limited (KISCOL) is a $400 million sugar processing facility commissioned in 2015 incorporating 5,500 hectares of cultivated cane, a 3,300 tones-crushed-per-day sugar mill, an 18 megawatt bagasse-fired power plant and a sophisticated irrigation and water management system, resulting in affordable, locally grown sugar. The project commenced operations in 2014. It is a Pabari Group flagship project.

On full capacity, the facility will also sustain an impressive 30,000 liters ethanol generation plant. The projected sugar production would help in meeting the deficit of Kenya’s sugar consumption, which is approximately 400,000 metric tones per year.

With state-of-the art technology, including a sub-surface drip-fed irrigation system, KISCOL saves on 40% of the water requirements for crop growth. With the systems put in place, KISCOL harvests about 60 tons of rain fed cane per hectare and 100 tons of irrigated cane per hectare. At least 1200 registered out-growers produce sugarcane on 4,200 hectares of land.

== Ownership ==
Kwale International Sugar Company Limited is a privately owned company. The table below illustrates the ownership structure of the company.

KISCOL Stock Ownership
| Rank | Name of Owner | Percentage Ownership |
|---|---|---|
| 1 | Omnicane of Mauritius | 25.0 |
| 2 | Pabari Investments Limited of Kenya | 75.0 |
| | Total | 100.00 |

== Controversy ==
On Thursday 5 April 2018, the Kwale County Woman Representative and Member of Parliament, Zuleikha Hassan, publicly made an outcry stating that the residents and indigenous owners of the villages of Vidzaini, Fingirika, Vumbu, Nyumba Sita, Fahamuni, Mabatani, and Gonjora would be forcefully evicted in the near future. According to her, they would be evicted by instruction of a letter from the Chairman of National Lands Commission and a court order, so as to make space for Kwale International Sugar Company Limited, to plant its sugarcane.

The owners/residents were give one week notice from the previous Saturday. Many of the residents of these villages were not even aware that plans were underway to evict them. Should this happen, it is projected that 800 families will have their properties and farms taken away and they will have nowhere to go.

== See also ==
- Kwale
- Kenya Economy
- Kenya Sugar Companies
