= Kinango Constituency =

Kenyan electoral constituency

Kinango
- constituency for the Parliament of Kenya
- Kinango Constituency within Kwale County

- Kwale County within Kenya
- County: Kwale
- Population: 94,220
- Area: 1,612 km^{2} (622.4 sq mi)

Current constituency
- Number of members: 1
- Party: PAA
- Member of Parliament: Samuel Gonzi Rai
- Wards: 7

Kinango Constituency is an electoral constituency in Kenya. It is one of four constituencies in Kwale County which has nine wards, all electing ward representatives for the Kwale County Assembly. The constituency was established for the 1988 elections.

It is not to be confused with Kinangop Constituency in Nyandarua County.

== Members of Parliament ==
Elections	MP	Party	Notes
1988	Ali Abdalla Bidu	KANU	One-party system.
1992	Samuel Gonzi Rai	KANU	
1997	Simeon M. Mkalla	KANU	
2002	Samuel Gonzi Rai	Ford-People	
2007	Samuel Gonzi Rai	Ford-People	
2013	Samuel Gonzi Rai	TNA	
2017	Benjamin Dalu Stephen Tayari	ODM	
2022	Samuel Gonzi Rai	PAA	

== Locations and wards ==
Locations	Population
Chengoni	11,204
Gandini	18,618
Kasemeni	21,870
Kinango	13,311
Mackinnon Road	8,094
Makamini	12,556
Mtaa	10,828
Mwatate	14,464
Mwavumbo	15,721
Ndavaya	16,147
Puma	14,573
Samburu	17,079
Taru	8,190
Vigurungani	12,928
Total	195,583
1999 census.

Ward	Registered Voters
Chengoni	2,624
Kasemeni	5,244
Kinango	4,032
Mackinnon road / Taru	4,842
Mtaa / Gandini	7,647
Mwavumbo / Mwatate	7,425
Ndavaya	4,299
Samburu / Makamini	6,547
Vigurungani / Puma	6,521
Total	49,181
*September 2005.
