= 2013 Kwale local elections =

2013 local elections in Kenya

Local elections were held in Kwale to elect a Governor and County Assembly on 4 March 2013. Under the new constitution, which was passed in a 2010 referendum, the 2013 general elections were the first in which Governors and members of the County Assemblies for the newly created counties were elected.

== Gubernatorial election ==
| Candidate | Running Mate | Coalition | Party | Votes |
|---|---|---|---|---|
| Dena, James Daniel Gereza | Syano, Masai Wambua | | KADU–Asili | -- |
| Mambo, Kassim Rigga | Langoni, Hemed Mwahonza | | United Republican Party | -- |
| Mgala, Salim Mvurya | Achani, Fatuma Mohamed | | United Democratic Forum Party | -- |
| Nyanje, Michael Chidzao | Kivungi, Gabriel Mutie | | The Independent Party | -- |
| Wa-Mwachai, Mwarapayo Abdalla Mohamed | Chimerah, Rocha Mzungu | | Kenya National Congress | -- |

== Prospective candidates ==
The following are some of the candidates who have made public their intentions to run:

- Mohammed wa Mwachai – Forest and Wildlife Permanent Secretary
- Kassim Riga – Mombasa Polytechnic University College Lecturer
- Simeon Mkallah – former Kinango MP and Kenya African National Union Chief Whip
- Michael Nyanje
- Salim Mphurya
