= Ukunda =

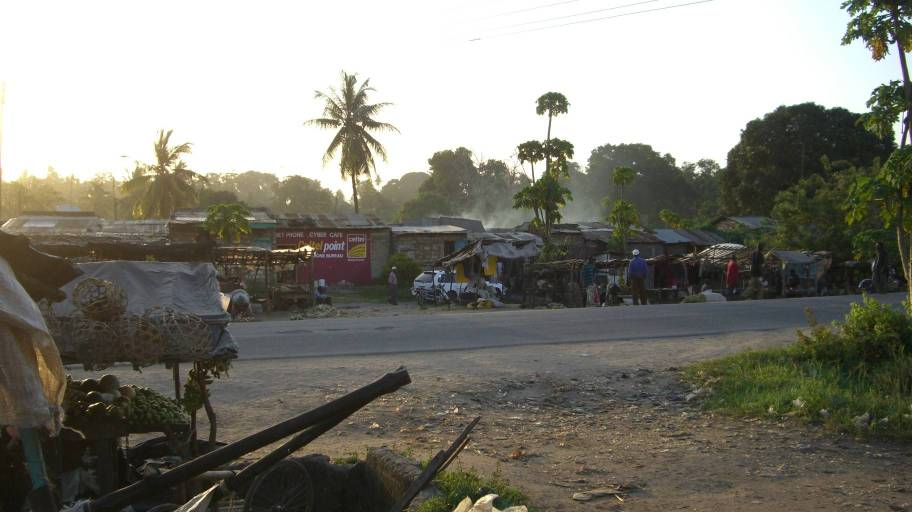
- A14 at Ukunda

- Location within Kenya Location within the Horn of Africa Location within Africa
- Coordinates: 04°17′15″S 39°33′58″E
- Country: Kenya
- County: Kwale County

Population (2019 census)
  - Urban: 77,686
- Time zone: UTC+3 (EAT)
- Website: Diani Beach - Ukunda

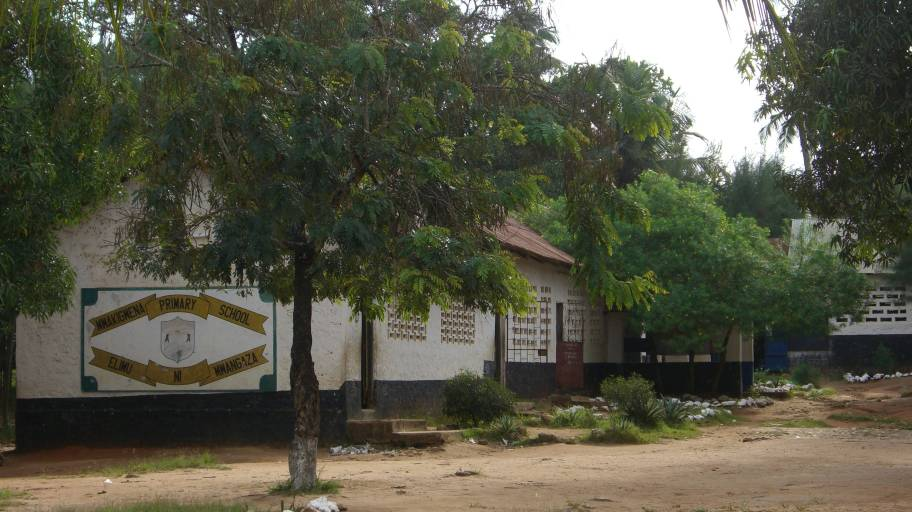
Mwakigwena Primary School

Ukunda is a coastal town 25.8 km south of Mombasa. It is adjacent to Diani Beach, a major tourist area. The urban population was 77,686 in 2019.

== Location ==
Ukunda is located in Kwale County, Coast Province, adjacent and to the immediate west of Diani Beach. and 75.4 kilometres (46.9 mi) north of the town of Lunga Lunga, at the border with Tanzania. The coordinates of Ukunda are: 4°17'15.0"S, 39°33'58.0"E (Latitude: -4.287500; Longitude: 39.566111).

== Transport ==
Highway A-14 starts in Mombasa and runs through Ukunda, continuing south through Lunga Lunga, crossing the border into Tanzania to Tanga, ending just outside Morogoro. Ukunda is served by the Ukunda Airport.

== Businesses ==
In November 2015, The Star reported that Naivas Supermarkets had opened a store in Ukunda at Gate Mall outlets.

== See also ==
- Kwale
- Diani Beach
- Msambweni
- List of supermarket chains in Kenya
- Historic Swahili Settlements
- Swahili architecture
