= Chirau Ali Mwakwere =

Kenyan politician and diplomat

- Constituency: Matuga Constituency

Minister for Transport
- In office December 2005 – February 5, 2010
- President: Mwai Kibaki
- Preceded by: John Michuki
- Succeeded by: Amos Kimunya

Minister of Foreign Affairs
- In office June 2004 – December 2005
- President: Mwai Kibaki
- Preceded by: Kalonzo Musyoka
- Succeeded by: Raphael Tuju

Personal details
- Born: June 15, 1945 (age 80) Kwale, Kenya
- Party: Wiper Democratic Movement (2017-2022); Orange Democratic Movement 2017; Jubilee Alliance (until 2017) United Republican Party (2013); National Rainbow Coalition (2002–2013); Kenya African National Union (before 2002)
- Spouse: Rose Batsigira
- Occupation: Politician, Diplomat
- Known for: Singing campaign slogan "Zipapa Zipapa"

Chirau Ali Mwakwere (born June 15, 1945, in Kwale, Kenya) is a Kenyan politician and diplomat. He served as the Foreign Minister of Kenya from June 2004 to December 2005, and then became transport minister in December 2005, when serious problems within the National Rainbow Coalition caused a cabinet reshuffle. As a young man he was well-educated and joined government service in 1967, serving as an ambassador to several countries and also in several domestic positions, including education. He was a member of the Kenya African National Union until 2002, rising to the rank of deputy leader, but left to join the new opposition National Rainbow Coalition which won the 2002 elections.

Mwakwere remained Minister for Transport in the Cabinet named by then President Mwai Kibaki on January 8, 2008, following the controversial December 2007 presidential election, and after Kibaki and his rival, Raila Odinga, reached a power-sharing agreement, Mwakwere remained in his post as Minister for Transport in the grand coalition Cabinet named on April 13, 2008.

As of Friday, February 5, 2010, Mwakwere lost his cabinet and parliamentary seat. This was due to a petition filed by a voter, Ayub Juma Mwakesi, who wanted the election of Mwakwere nullified, claiming that the entire election process was marred by irregularities. The ruling that nullified Mwakwere's election in the bungled 2007 election was made by High Court Judge Justice Mohamed Ibrahim. A subsequent by-election was held on July 12, 2010. Mwakwere retained the seat by beating his closest rival, Hassan Mwanyoha of ODM. He sings during campaign rallies and his favorite mobilizing tune is commonly referred to 'Zipapa Zipapa'. .

After a stint as Kenyan High commissioner to Tanzania, Mwakere ran for a seat in the Senate of Kenya for Kwale County as a candidate for the United Republican Party, part of the Jubilee Alliance during the 2013 Kenyan general election, but lost to the Orange Democratic Movement candidate Boy Juma Boy.

In 2017 Mwakere announced running for the Orange Democratic Movement against incumbent Salim Mvurya for the governorship of Kwale county. Shortly after, he distanced himself form the Orange Democratic Movement and joined the Wiper Democratic Movement – Kenya. He was made chairman of the party in 2019. He resigned that position in the aftermath of the 2022 Kenyan general election. After his exit from the Wiper Democratic Movement, he became the spokesperson for the Digo people of Kenya.

== Personal life ==
Mwakwere is married to Ugandan Rose Batsigira. They live in Nairobi and own a home in Mwakwere's home village of Golini in Ziwani, Kwale District. He is part of the Digo community, a Muslim and enjoys playing golf.
