= Matuga Constituency =

Electoral constituency in Kenya

Matuga
- constituency for the Parliament of Kenya
- Matuga Constituency within Kwale County

- Kwale County within Kenya
- County: Kwale
- Population: 194,252
- Area: 1,034 km^{2} (399.2 sq mi)

Current constituency
- Number of members: 1
- Party: ANC
- Member of Parliament: Kassim Sawa Tandaza
- Wards: 5

Matuga Constituency is an electoral constituency in Kenya. It is one of four constituencies in Kwale County. The constituency was established for the 1988 elections.

== Members of Parliament ==
Elections	MP	Party	Notes
1988	Boy Juma Boy	KANU	One-party system.
1992	Boy Juma Boy	KANU	
1997	Suleiman Mwarunga Kamolleh	KANU	
2002	Chirau Ali Mwakwere	NARC	
2007	Chirau Ali Mwakwere	PNU	The result was nullified by a court in 2010
2010	Chirau Ali Mwakwere	PNU	By-election
2013	Hassan Mohamed Mwanyoha	ODM	
2017	Kassim Sawa Tandaza	ANC	
2022	Kassim Sawa Tandaza	ANC	

== Locations and wards ==
Locations	Population
Golini	12,166
Lukore	3,150
Majimbo	7,348
Mangawani	8,947
Mbuguni	5,130
Mkongani	15,734
Mwaluphamba	19,924
Mwaluvanga	3,401
Ng'ombeni	18,773
Shimba Hills	162
Tiwi	19,178
Tsimba	12,863
Waa	18,714
Total	145,490
1999 census.

Ward	Registered Voters	Local Authority
Golini/Vyongwani	1,448	Kwale town
Kubo South	5,396	Kwale county
Kwale	2,347	Kwale town
Mazumalume	1,430	Kwale town
Mbuguni / Ng'ombeni	5,075	Kwale county
Mkongani / Mangawani	6,247	Kwale county
Mwaluphamba	5,755	Kwale county
Mwamgunga	1,051	Kwale town
Tiwi	6,485	Kwale county
Vuga	1,545	Kwale town
Waa	5,383	Kwale county
Ziwani	902	Kwale town
Total	43,064	
*September 2005.
