= Tiwi, Kenya =

Tiwi
- Location within Kenya
- Coordinates: 4°15′10″S 39°35′31″E
- Country: Kenya
- County: Kwale County
- Time zone: UTC+3 (EAT)

Tiwi is a small settlement and beach resort in Kenya. It is located north of Diani Beach, and is approximately 17 kilometres (11 mi) south of Mombasa.

The area is served by Ukunda Airport and the A14 road via the Likoni Ferry from Mombasa. While neighboring Diani Beach has seen a strong increase in tourism in recent decades, Tiwi has remained less developed in terms of tourism facilities. The area is expected to see an increase in tourism with the completion of the Dongo Kundu Bypass Highway (a.k.a. the Mombasa Southern Bypass).

Protected by a coral reef providing a natural breakwater, Tiwi is characterized by calm, shallow waters and white, sandy beaches.

Nearby tourist attractions include the Shimba Hills National Reserve and the Kisite-Mpunguti Marine National Park.

Tiwi is located in Matuga Constituency of Kwale County.

== See also ==
- Historic Swahili Settlements
- Swahili architecture
