= Suleiman Dori =

Kenyan politician (1977–2020)

Personal details
- Born: 19 October 1977 Gazi, Kwale County, Kenya
- Died: 9 March 2020 (aged 42) Mombasa, Mombasa County, Kenya

Suleiman Dori (19 October 1977 – 9 March 2020) was a Kenyan politician who served as a member of parliament from Msambweni.

== Biography ==
Dori was born on 19 October 1977 in the town of Gazi, Kenya. He was the youngest of eleven children, eight sisters and three brothers. His father was a driver and his mother did odd jobs to finance the family. He studied at Gazi Primary School, then at Waa High School in Kwale. He later dropped out of high school to live with his sister in Mombasa, where he was admitted to Tudor Secondary School. Dori gained his Kenya Certificate of Secondary Education from Tudor Secondary School in 1998. After gaining his certificate, he proceeded to begin studies in information technology, which he had to quit due to a lack of funds. In order to support his bedridden mother, he teamed up with a friend named Dalainea to sell charcoal and firewood. In 2001, Dori came to Nairobi to perform menial jobs and earn money, which he eventually used to enroll into the YMCA. He was elected to the National Assembly in March 2013 and reelected in August 2017. He died of cancer on 9 March 2020, at the Aga Khan Hospital, Mombasa.
