= Msambweni Constituency =

Constituency in Kenya

Msambweni
- constituency for the Parliament of Kenya
- Msambweni Constituency within Kwale County

- Kwale County within Kenya
- County: Kwale
- Population: 177,690
- Area: 412 km^{2} (159.1 sq mi)

Current constituency
- Number of members: 1
- Party: UDA
- Member of Parliament: Feisal Abdallah Bader Salim
- Wards: 4

Msambweni Constituency is an electoral constituency in Kenya. It is one of four constituencies in Kwale County. The constituency has ten wards, all electing councillors for the Kwale County Council. The constituency was established for the 1988 elections.

== Members of Parliament ==
Elections	MP	Party	Notes
1988	Kassim Bakari Mwamzandi	KANU	One-party system.
1992	Kassim Bakari Mwamzandi	KANU	
1997	Marere Wa Mwachai	KANU	
2002	Abdalla Jumaa Ngozi	NARC	
2007	Omar Zonga	ODM	
2013	Suleiman Dori Ramadhani	ODM	The late
2017	Suleiman Dori Ramadhani	ODM	The late
2022	Bader Salim Feisal	UDA	

== Locations and wards ==
Locations	Population
Diani	60,565
Dzombo	36,118
Kikoneni	17,571
Kingwende/Shirazi	10,656
Kinondo	20,798
Lunga Lunga	20,101
Mivumoni	10,300
Msambweni	17,104
Mwereni	32,034
Pongwe/Kidimu	15,104
Vanga	13,744
Total	254,095
1999 census.

Ward	Registered Voters
Diani	15,751
Dzombo	7,571
Kasemeni / Sega	5,665
Kikoneni	4,444
Kingwende/Shirazi	3,836
Kinondo	6,107
Mivumoni / Msambweni	9,136
Mwereni	4,930
Pongwe/Kidimu	5,573
Vanga	4,216
Total	67,229
*September 2005.
