= Kenya Ports Authority =

Kenyan government organization

Agency overview
- Formed: 1978
- Jurisdiction: Government of Kenya
- Headquarters: Mombasa Island Mombasa, Kenya
- Agency executives: Captain William Ruto, Chairman; John MWangemi, Chief Executive Officer
- Parent agency: Kenya Ministry of Transport
- Website: Homepage

Kenya Ports Authority (KPA) is a state corporation with the responsibility to "maintain, operate, improve and regulate all scheduled seaports" on the Indian Ocean coastline of Kenya, including principally Kilindini Harbour at Mombasa. Other KPA ports include Lamu, Malindi, Kilifi, Mtwapa, Kiunga, Shimoni, Funzi and Vanga.

== Location ==
The headquarters of KPA are located inside the Port of Mombasa in the Kenyan coast. The coordinates of the headquarters of Kenya Ports Authority are 04°04'13.0"S, 39°39'52.0"E (Latitude:-4.070267; Longitude:39.664452). KPA also has offices in its other ports namely Lamu, Nairobi dry port, Naivasha dry port, Eldoret dry port and Kisumu port.

== History ==
The KPA was established in 1978 through an act of Parliament.

== Overview ==
Kenya Ports Authority is an investor in Kenya National Shipping Line, a state corporation of Kenya formed in 1989, currently owned by KPA and three non-Kenyan corporate investos.

In 1989, the government of Kenya brought together the operation and regulation of existing ferry services, including the Likoni Ferry service at Likoni, Mombasa, into one subsidiary of the KPA, Kenya Ferry Services. The subsidiary was devolved to the status of an independent Kenya state corporation in 1998, 20 percent owned by KPA and 80 percent owned by other Kenyan Government entities.

KPA also owns various sports teams, including Kenyan Premier League team Bandari FC and a leading basketball club.

In August 2014, Kenya Ports Authority signed a deal worth US$478 million with China Communications Construction Company (CCCC) for the construction of three Port Lamu berths. The three new berths will form part of the US$24 billion Lamu Port and Lamu-Southern Sudan-Ethiopia Transport Corridor (LAPSSET) and take Port Lamu's berth count to 32 upon completion.

== See also ==
- Kilindini Harbour at Mombasa
- Port authority
- Port operator
- Transport in Kenya
