= Chale Island =

Island in Kenya

Coordinates: 4.4500°S 39.5333°E

Chale Island is a headland rather than an island, located at the northern end of Msambweni Bay in Kwale County in southeastern Kenya. Originally, "Chale" was the name of a Digo warrior. Chale was buried on this island after dying. Chale Island is known as a sacred kaya (worshipping place) by the locals.

For beach enthusiasts, this exclusive sandy island is the absolute dream location. Chale Island is a tropical haven with mangrove forests and green coral reefs as its lush green vegetation. Additionally, while on the island, visitors can enjoy beautiful views of the Indian Ocean's blue-green waters, which are equally as beautiful as the island itself. The island's intensely beautiful views go well with the opulent Italian, Oriental, and Swahili cuisines. You can experience a lovely atmosphere by traveling to this peaceful Island.

The island is largely renowned for its breathtaking and serene sandy beaches, as the name would imply. The large beach, which is located in the island's northeast, is located 175 meters from the resort's front and is 70 meters deep. On this portion of the island, breathtaking coral reefs may be discovered around 750 meters from the gorgeous beach. Additionally, you may see the many and healing tidal flows that wash over the reef from this location. The beach on the eastern side of the island, which looks out over Gazi Town, is the ideal location to see mangrove woods that link to Gazi Bay. The beach on the southeast side is 100 meters long and roughly 50 meters deep. A substantial mangrove forest that leads to the Gulf of Gavi is also located on the western side of the island.
