= Mkondo wa Simiti =

River in Kenya

Mkondo wa Simiti is a river in Kenya's Coast Province.
