= Hassan Mwanyoha =

Kenyan politician

Hassan Mohamed Mwanyoha is a Kenyan politician and a former member of the Kenya parliament elected from Matuga Constituency, Kwale County. He was first elected to the Parliament in 2002 and again in 2013. He previously served as a councilor of Tiwi Ward for 15 years on a ticket of the Kenya African National Union (KANU).

== Political career ==
Mwanyoha began his political career at grassroot level and served as councilor for Tiwi Ward for 15 years on the ticket of KANU party. He left the seat in 2002 to run for Matuga Constituency seat in the national assembly, which he won on the ticket of Orange Democratic Movement (ODM). He served in the parliament from 2002 to 2007 but lost his re-election bid to his challenger Chirau Ali Mwakwere, a former transport minister who ran on the ticket of PNU. Mwanyoha contested his re-election defeat in court which nullified the election and ordered a re-run. Mwanyoha again lost to his opponent in the by-election held in July 2010 after 10, 887 votes placed him second behind his challenger Chirau Ali Mwakwere who gathered 16,350 to win the by-election. He reclaimed the seat in the 2013 parliamentary election and served on the Joint Committee on Parliamentary Broadcasting and Library.
