= Cynthia Muge =

Kenyan politician

- Born: c.1993 Kipsirichoi
- Education: University of Nairobi
- Occupation: politician
- Known for: young MP
- Political party: United Democratic Alliance

Cynthia Muge nicknamed Cheptikonyol (born c.1993) is a Kenyan politician. She served in Kilibwoni and she was elected in a landslide victory in 2022 to the National Assembly to represent Nandi County.

== Life ==
Muge was born on 29 July 1993 in a village called Kipsirichoi in the Emgwen Constituency of Nandi County. She attended the Moi Girls Insiya high school and later graduated from the University of Nairobi in 2016 with a degree in Urban and Regional Planning. She later returned to study Project Planning and Management in 2018 and was awarded a masters degree in 2020.

Muge was elected a member of the County Assembly of Kilibwoni ward in Nandi County in 2017. She had run as an independent and she emerged victorious in a tightly contested race.

Hon. Muge was the youngest of the six women politicians who were elected MPs on 9 August 2022 general elections after serving in the respective county assemblies. The other five were Beatrice Elachi came from Nairobi county, Umul Ker Kassim was from Garissa County, Fatuma Masito was from Kwale County, Susan Ngugi Mwindo from Tharacki Nithi and Leah Sopiarto was from the Kajiarto government.

After the 2022 election she introduced several programmes for empowering women her area. One such programme is the Mama na Kahawa project that encourages women to become coffee farmers through distribution of seedlings. Muge noted that women engaged in prolonged ageicultural menial work but they enjoyed little benefits. She also extended training programmes so that they could help revive the coffee industry. By 2025 the project was distributing 500,000 coffee plant seedlings to 5,000 women.
