= Kigombo =

- Location within Kenya
- Coordinates: 3.38°S 38°E
- Country: Kenya
- Province: Coast Province
- Time zone: UTC+3 (EAT)

Kigombo is a settlement in Kenya's Coast Province. A water reservoir, called Kigombo Reservoir, was commissioned near the settlement with 6 acres (2.4 ha) of land devoted by the Provincial Commissioner S.O.V. Hodge on 11 July 1941.
