= Elachi =

Elachi is a surname. Notable people with the surname include:

- Beatrice Elachi (born 1973), Kenyan politician
- Charles Elachi (born 1947), Lebanese-American electrical engineer and astronomer

== See also ==
- 4116 Elachi, a main-belt asteroid
