= Kadzinuni =

- Location within Kenya
- Coordinates: 3.75°S 39.82°E
- Country: Kenya
- Province: Coast Province
- Time zone: UTC+3 (EAT)

Kadzinuni is a settlement in Kenya's Coast Province.

== The Friends of Kadzinuni ==
The Friends of Kadzinuni was a UK based charity which worked to transform Kadzinuni into self-sufficient wealth creating community through support of community led projects for Healthcare, Education and Agriculture. The charity closed and was dissolved in June 2024.
