= Mguya =

- Location within Kenya
- Coordinates: 4.67°S 39.2°E
- Country: Kenya
- Province: Coast Province
- Time zone: UTC+3 (EAT)

Mguya is a settlement in Kenya's Coast Province.

For the Mpondomise, the Mguya is also a ritual that celebrates authority and fertility, and that reaffirms the heroic status of chiefs as the descendants of men who slew leopards and who brought nourishing rains.
