= Kongo River =

Kongo River may refer to:

- Congo River, a major river in Africa
- Mwachema River, a minor river in East Africa
