= Kwale =

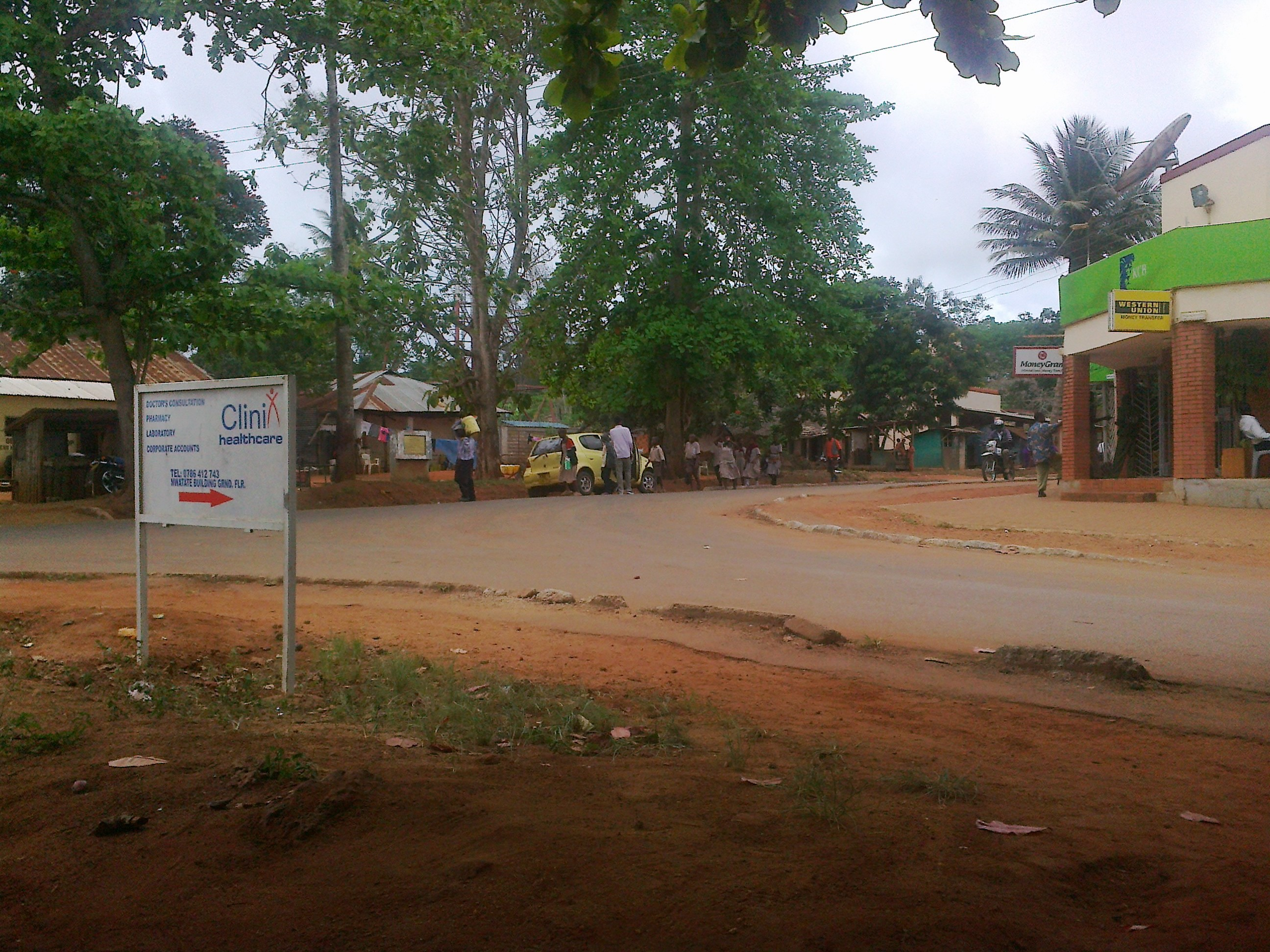

- Location within Kenya Location within the Horn of Africa Location within Africa
- Coordinates: 4°10′28″S 39°27′37″E
- Country: Kenya
- County: Kwale County

Population (2019)
  - Total: 10,063
- Time zone: UTC+3 (EAT)

Kwale Town is the capital of Kwale County, Kenya. It is located at 4°10′28″S 39°27′37″E; 30 km southwest of Mombasa and 15 km inland. The town had an urban population of 10,063 (2019 census). It is next to the Shimba Hills National Reserve.

The city of Μombasa can be seen from Golini due to its high altitude. Close to Kwale is the Shimba Hills Hotel and Mwalughanje Elephant Sanctuary along the KWS (Kenya Wildlife Service) strip. Kwale is the main town of the Digo and Duruma people. These people belong to the Mijikenda ethnic group of the former Coast Province of Kenya. Other tribes found in the county include the Kamba, Arabs, and Indians, and other minority tribes like the Makonde, Vumba (Zimba), Degere & Segeju, though most have been assimilated by either the Digo or Duruma.

The area extends from Shika Adabu in the south, to Kinango and then southwards to Lunga Lunga on the border with Tanzania.

== Politics ==
The governor for Kwale County is Salim Mgalla Mvurya who ran on an ODM ticket in the 2013 general elections and on a Jubilee ticket in 2017. His rivals in the 2013 race were Mwarapayo wa-Mwachai, Rigga Kassim Mambo, Simeon Mkalla, Michael Nyanje and James Dena. The senator for the county is Issa Boy Juma, son of the former MP of Matuga Constituency the late Boy Juma. The late Juma Boy was the first Senator for the County in 2013 and his opponents were immediate former MP of Matuga Constituency Chirau Ali Mkwakwere and Nicholas Zani. The Women's Representative is Zuleikha Hassan Juma who succeeded the first Woman Representative Zeinab Kalekye Chidzuga who, like Governor Mvurya, ran on an ODM ticket in 2013. She ran against Fatuma Masito and Mwanasaid Makoti. 2013 was the first time that the people of Kenya have had to vote for a governor, senator and women's representative.

Since independence in 1963, Kwale has had 4 members of parliament. Juma Boy was a well-known trade union activist. He was the first to hold the seat. Upon his death, he was succeeded by his son, The late Boy Juma Boy, who served for three 5-year terms. He was ousted by Suleiman Kamole in the 1997 general elections. Kamole served for one term before being ousted by Chirau Ali Mwakwere in the 2002 general elections. Mwakwere served for 2 consecutive terms. He unsuccessfully ran for the senatorial seat in 2013.

Kwale County has 4 constituencies namely Matuga, Kinango, Msambweni and Lunga Lunga. The members of parliament for these areas are Hassan Mwanyoha, Gonzi Rai, Suleiman Dori and Khatib Mwashetani respectively. Kwale County, like many other counties in the Coastal region, is a stronghold of the Ora.

Kwale is a very important town for small scale farmers from the inland areas of Golini, Kinango, Mkongani, Mwaluphamba, Tiribe and many others for the sale and transport of their produce. Among other farm products, Kwale produces oranges, pawpaws, mangoes, bixa, coconuts, a variety of vegetables and cereals.
