= Samburu =

Samburu may refer to the following entities in Kenya:

- Samburu people
- Samburu language
- Samburu National Reserve
- Samburu County
- Samburu, Kwale County, a village
