= Kung'u Ndung'u =

Kenyan engineer and corporate executive

- Born: 1 January 1972 (age 54); Kenya
- Education: University of Nairobi (Bachelor of Science in Civil Engineering); Jomo Kenyatta University (Executive MBA)
- Occupations: Engineer and business executive
- Years active: 1998 — present
- Known for: Professional competence

Kung'u Ndung'u is a Kenyan civil engineer and business executive who was appointed as the Director-General of the Kenya National Highways Authority (KeNHA), effective 8 October 2021. He replaced Peter Mundinia who retired. Before his current assignment, Kung'u was the Director of Road Asset and Corridor Management at KeNHA.

== Early life and education ==
Kung'u was born circa 1972. He attended Kenyan primary and secondary schools. He was admitted to the University of Nairobi to study civil engineering, graduating in 1997 with a Bachelor of Science in Civil Engineering. Later, he was awarded an Executive Master of Business Administration (Executive MBA), by Jomo Kenyatta University.

== Career ==
Kung'u has spent most of his professional career at KeNHA. He is reported to have overseen the construction of the Dongo Kundu Bypass Highway, the Mwache Bridge Project and the Kitui–Kibwezi Road Project, among others.

It is reported that during the interview for his current position, he demonstrated "wide knowledge" of roads engineering and showed evidence of "leadership and management abilities". He is reported to possess a number of leadership skills, including "prudent financial management, human resource management and good governance".

He was appointed as director general at KeNHA on 8 October 2021. His performance was satisfactory and his three-year contract was renewed in 2024.

However, Kung'u tendered his resignation on 11 July 2025.

== Other considerations ==
Kung'u Ndung'u was named employee of the year in 2017, at Kenya National Highways Authority.

Preceded by Peter Mundinia	Director General of KeNHA; 2021 – Present	Succeeded by Incumbent
