= Umul Ker Kassim =

Kenyan politician

- Occupation: politician
- Known for: member of the National Assembly
- Political party: United Democratic Movement

Umul Ker Kassim or Sheikh Umul Ker Kassim is a Kenyan UDM politician. She was a politician in Mandera County who was elected in 2022 to the National Assembly for the UDM party.

== Life ==
Kassim was a graduate of the Kenya Methodist University. She had attended the Kenya Medical Training College from 2001 to 2007.

Kassim was a politician in Kwale County. She was one of six women politicians who were elected on 9 August 2022 who had been serving as leaders in their county. The other five were Beatrice Elachi came from Nairobi county, 24 year old Cynthia Muge was from Kilibwoni County, Fatuma Masito was from Kwale County, Susan Ngugi Mwindo from Tharacki Nithi and Linda Sopiarto was from the Kajiarto government.

In 2023 she was named as one of the better women representatives in Kenya. However women representatives did not score well in the survey as those asked seemed to favour governors. Kassim was in the top 25 in a list headed by Turkana County's Cecilia Asinyen and Kirinyaga County's Jane Njeri.

As an MP in 2025 she supported proposed changes to the funding of County government arguing that their ability to govern was limited by financial control.
