= Tana River Sugar Company =

- Type: Private company
- Industry: Sugar manufacturing Agriculture; Renewable energy
- Area served: Kenya
- Key people: Paul Limoh
- Products: Sugar, molasses, ethanol, electricity
- Website: Homepage

Tana River Sugar Company Limited (TRSC) is a privately held Kenyan agribusiness start-up venture developing an integrated sugarcane cultivation, sugar milling, ethanol distillation and biomass power generation complex at Bura, in Tana River County, Kenya. The company's project is sited within the Bura Irrigation Scheme, a gravity fed irrigation area administered by Kenya's National Irrigation Authority (NIA).

The venture forms part of efforts to reduce Kenya's dependence on imported sugar, as domestic mills produce less than national consumption requires. The project has been developed under a public–private partnership framework involving the Government of Kenya and the National Irrigation Authority.

== History ==
The Bura Irrigation Scheme, within which the Tana River Sugar Company project is located, was established in 1978 as a gravity-fed irrigation scheme supported by the World Bank and managed by the National Irrigation Authority, covering a gazetted area of approximately 176,000 acres. Tana River Sugar Company began a trial phase of sugarcane cultivation within the scheme, planting seed cane on a 700-acre parcel provided by the National Irrigation Authority.

In April 2026, the National Irrigation Authority and TRSC signed a lease agreement within the Bura Irrigation Scheme, together with an accompanying commercial agreement, enabling the company to expand into large-scale commercial sugarcane production.

== Ownership ==
Tana River Sugar Company Limited is a privately owned company.

== See also ==
- Kenya Economy
- Kenya Sugar Factories
- Sugar production in Kenya
- Agriculture in Kenya
- Tana River County
- Tana River
