= Marere wa Mwachai =

Kenyan politician

Marerere Mwarapayo wa Mwachai

Member of Parliament, Msambweni Constituency
- In office 1997–2002
- Preceded by: Kassim Mwamzandi
- Succeeded by: Abdalla Ngozi

Personal details
- Born: Kenya
- Party: Kenya African National Union (KANU), New Vision Party
- Profession: Politician, Educator

Marerere Mwarapayo wa Mwachai is a Kenyan politician and was the Member of Parliament (MP) for Msambweni Constituency from 1997 to 2002. She also served as the assistant minister for Gender, Culture and Social Services. She lost the 1992 elections for Msambweni Constituency to Kassim Mwamzandi. She also lost the 2002 elections to Abdalla Ngozi. Mwachai worked as a school teacher before venturing into politics.

== Controversy ==
In November 1999, Mwachai was ordered by court to pay Jones Munyaga Ksh. 58,000 for attacking him while he was on duty. Munyaga claimed he blocked Mwachai from entering into St. Augustine's Preparatory School on a Sunday evening. Mwachai's daughter was a student at the school, and Munyaga worked as a night guard. The school's rules did not allow visitation on Sundays. When he blocked her, Mwachai told her security detail to cuff him up and forced her way into the school.

In June 2017, Mwachai was accused by her adopted son, Shaahidin Rajab, for abandoning him. Mwachai adopted Rajab from Mama Fatuma Goodwill Children's Home in Eastleigh, Nairobi. He, however, says that he was overworked in the Mwachai household and was always the first suspect whenever household items went amiss. Mwachai, however, accused him of having been a trouble child who has had several run-ins with the law. Mwachai said that despite having schooled him at Msambweni Primary School from class one to eight, Rajab was constantly arguing with her firstborn daughter and stealing things from the house.

== Legacy ==
Mwachai was the first woman in the Coast region to be elected to parliament.

In 2002 after then president Daniel arap Moi announced that Uhuru Kenyatta would be the KANU presidential candidate, many prominent KANU members ditched the party. Mwachai was one of the few who stayed put and backed Uhuru for the presidency.

In July 2017, she ran for MP Msambweni Constituency on a New Vision Party ticket and lost . She is also the secretary general of the party.

In 2022 Mwachai lost Msambweni parliamentary seat to Feisal Bader.
