= Funzi Island =

- Location within Kenya
- Coordinates: 4.57°S 39.43°E
- Country: Kenya
- County: Kwale County
- Time zone: UTC+3 (EAT)

Funzi Island is a settlement in Kenya's Kwale County. Funzi consists of four mangrove covered islands where Funzi Island is the main island and the only one with permanent inhabitants. There is one village on the island with approximately 1500 members of the Shirazi Tribe. The absolute majority are Muslims and sustain on fishing and agriculture. The archipelago is located in Kwale district and is less known to tourists than the nearby Diani Beach.

== Environment ==
Funzi Island is known for its pristine beaches and as Kenya's best nesting site for a variety of sea turtles, such as green turtle, Chelonia mydas, hawksbill, Eretmochelys imbricata and leatherback, Dermochelys coriacea. These species are classified as either endangered or critically endangered by the World Conservation Union (IUCN) but are found on Funzi due to a low degree of human disturbance on the natural sandy beaches. However, the turtles are becoming increasingly threatened in Funzi due to the expansion of non-environmental tourism and a heavy pressure from destructive fishing methods and various pollution sources.

== Tourism ==
Popular excursions for visitors in Funzi are the crocodile safari in the nearby Ramisi River or to going on a cultural tour in the village and enjoy a traditionally cooked lunch. The best swimming experience in the area will undoubtedly be on the naturally formed sandbank just offshore from Funzi village. Its fine sand ripples appear only during low tide and it stretches well over a kilometre in length.

Funzi Island does not have many hotels. Funzi Cove and Funzi Keys are the main ones, however both were closed as of early 2021.

A locally formed group called Funzi Turtle Club has started an ecotourism project with the support of Kenya Sea Turtle Conservation Trust to increase the protection and awareness about the local environment.

== Transport ==
It is possible to go to Funzi without an organised travel agency. A matatu will take you to Ramisi junction in one hour from the Likoni terminal south of Mombasa. Take a bodaboda, a motor cycle taxi, to the village Bodo, from where daily boats go to Funzi village.
