= Kikuyuni =

- Country: Kenya
- Province: Coast Province
- Time zone: UTC+3 (EAT)

Kikuyuni is a settlement in Kenya's Coast Province. It was named after immigrant Kikuyu who converted to Islam in the early twentieth century and intermarried with Swahili residents near Malindi.
