= Gandini =

Gandini is an Italian surname. Notable people with the surname include:

- Antonio Gandini (1565–1630), Italian Renaissance painter
- Brenda Gandini (born 1984), Argentine actress and model
- Erik Gandini (born 1967), Italian film director
- Ettore Gandini (born 1969), Italian footballer
- Franco Gandini (born 1936), Italian cyclist
- Gerardo Gandini (1936–2013), Argentine composer
- Giorgio Gandini del Grano (died 1538), Italian painter of the Parma school
- John Gandini (1929–2016), Australian trade unionist
- Len Gandini (born 1962), Australian rules footballer
- Marcello Gandini (1938–2024), Italian automobile designer
- Saverio Gandini (1729–1796), Italian painter

== Other ==
- Gandini Lianos (born 1987), show jumping horse
