= Zuleikha Hassan =

Kenyan politician

Zuleikha Hassan is a Kenyan politician. She is a member of the Orange Democratic Movement and the Kwale County Woman Representative and Member of Parliament.

== Early years and education ==
Hassan attended Coast Academy and Gaborone Junior Centre where she acquired her O-Level education. At Legae Academy in Gaborone, Botswana, she acquired her secondary education. She holds a bachelor's degree in Development and Social Transformation from the University of Cape Town, South Africa.

== Career ==
Hassan is currently the member of Parliament for the Kwale County, a position she has held since 2017. She was the National Youth Coordinator for the Orange Democratic Movement (ODM) until 2008, when she was promoted as the National Youth Deputy Chairperson of the party. She is the founder and chairlady for Taqwa Muslim Women Association, Mariakani. She co-founded the Inter Party Youth Forum in Kenya and is the program supervisor for Muslim Education & Welfare Association (MEWA).

On August 7, 2019, she was kicked out of Parliament for bringing her five-month-old baby to the parliamentary chambers. In protest to her removal, several MPs walked out of Parliament that day. This incident went viral and sparked debates on social media.

== Personal life ==
Hassan is married, and has three children.
