= Ramisi =

Ramisi misi
- Nickname: misi
- Location in Kenya
- Coordinates: 4°31′31″S 39°23′51″E
- Country: Kenya
- Province: Kwale County
- Time zone: UTC+3 (EAT)

Ramisi is a small town and ward in the Msambweni Constituency of Kwale County, southeastern Kenya, close to the Tanzanian border. A sugar processing factory is located in Ramisi, named the Kwale International Sugar Factory. Ramisi also has several schools. The Ramisi river flows to the west of the town.

Dr Mulji Modha (1939-2016) spent considerable time growing up in Ramisi. He came to love the wildlife around the sugar plantations, forests and rivers around Ramisi and eventually went on to become a leading authority in the world on crocodiles.
