= Gonzi Rai =

Kenyan politician

Gonzi Samuel Rai is a Kenyan politician and a former member of Kenyan parliament from Kinango Constituency in Kwale County. He was first elected to the parliament in 1992 on the ticket of Kenya African National Union (KANU), and 2002 and 2007 on the ticket of Forum for the Restoration of Democracy–People (FORD-People) and won the election on the ticket of The National Alliance (TNA) in the 2013 parliamentary election. His legislative interest focuses on defence, security and public accounts.

== Political career ==
Rai started his political career at the grassroot level and served as a councilor from 1988 to 1992. He contested and won Kinango Constituency seat in the National Elections on the ticket of KANU party. He lost his reelection to Simeon Mkalla in the 1997 parliamentary election before reclaiming the seat in 2002 and in 2007 on the FORD-People ticket where he was the vice-chairman. He served as assistant Minister of Lands in the Mwai Kibaki government from 2008 to 2013. He resigned from FORD-People in 2012 to support Uhuru Kenyatta presidential campaign on the condition that a member of his community would be appointed board chairman of Kenya Ferry Services (KSF). He was reelected to the seat in 2013 on the ticket of TNA party. Rai was defeated in the 2017 parliamentary election by Benjamin Tayari. In 2015, he was listed as one of the five "lazy MPs" who had never made a speech in the parliament.
