= Koromojo Dam =

Dam in Kenya

Coordinates: 4°26′33.57″S 39°27′37.08″E

The Koromojo Dam, also known as the Mwambe Dam, refers to two embankment dams (Upper and Lower) on the Mwabanda River north of Msambweni in southeastern Kenya. The Upper Koromojo Dam was built in the 1920s while the Lower Koromojo Dam was completed by Associated Sugar in 1957.
