= Fatuma Masito =

Kenyan politician

Fatuma Hamisi Masito
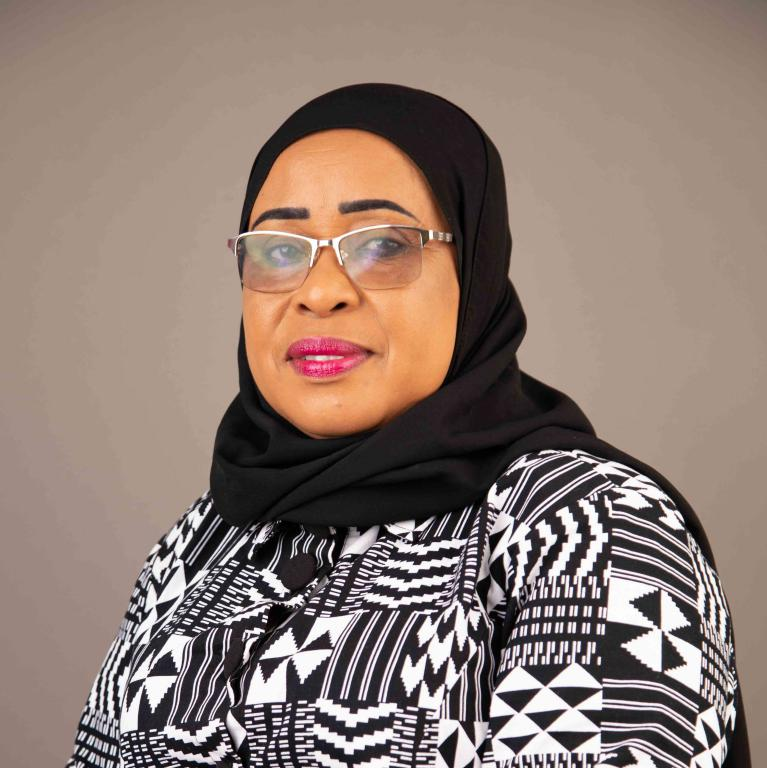

Women Representative for Kwale County
- Incumbent
- Assumed office 16 August 2022

Personal details
- Party: Orange Democratic Movement

Fatuma Hamisi Masito is a Kenyan politician. She is a member of the Orange Democratic Movement.

== Political career ==
Masito was the Orange Democratic Movement candidate elected women's representative in the National Assembly from Kwale County in the 2022 general election. She was known for campaigning for women's rights and her membership of the Assembly's Labour and Social Welfare committee.

She was one of six women politicians who were elected on 9 August 2022 who had been serving as leaders in their county. The other five were Beatrice Elachi came from Nairobi county, 24 year old Cynthia Muge was from Kilibwoni County, Umul Ker Kassim was from Mandera County, Susan Ngugi Mwindo from Tharacki Nithi and Linda Sopiarto was from the Kajiarto government.

In 2024 the Governor of Kwale County, Fatuma Achani, released funds that would supply bursaries to 2,700 students at National Schools. Masito noted as the women's representative that these bursaries were crucial.

In July 2025 Betsy Njagi and the Cabinet Secretary for Blue Economy and Maritime Affairs, Hassan Joho, opened a new fish hatchery at Shimoni. Invited dignitaries included Masito and the Governor Fatuma Achani.

== See also ==
- 13th Parliament of Kenya
