= Kwale mine =

Titanium mine in Coast, Kenya

- Location: Coast Province, Kenya
- Products: Titanium

The Kwale mine is one of the largest titanium mines in Kenya. The mine is located in the Coast Province. The mine has reserves amounting to 140.8 million tonnes of ore grading 6% titanium.
