= Kiongwe =

- Settlement
- Location within Kenya
- Coordinates: 2°23′S 40°47′E

Population (2009)
  - Total: 845
- Time zone: UTC+3 (EAT)

Kiongwe is a settlement in Kenya's Coast Province. Lying on the shore of the Indian Ocean it serves as a popular coastal tourism centre. The settlement has a population of 845 people as per the 2015 census.

Kiongwe is one of Kenya's oldest continually inhabited settlement and was one of the original Swahili settlements along coastal East Africa. Kiongwe is a popular settlement because of its Indian Ocean beaches, wildlife and at the same time it is a destination for backpackers.

== Geography and climate ==
Being a coastal settlement, Kiongwe is characterised by a flat topography.

Kiongwe has a warm, tropical climate. The amount of rainfall depends essentially on the season. The rainiest months are April and May, while from January to February the rainfall is minimal.

Climate data for Kiongwe
Month	Jan	Feb	Mar	Apr	May	Jun	Jul	Aug	Sep	Oct	Nov	Dec	Year
Mean daily maximum °C (°F)	32.0 (89.6)	32.3 (90.1)	32.6 (90.7)	31.2 (88.2)	29.3 (84.7)	28.4 (83.1)	27.7 (81.9)	27.9 (82.2)	28.8 (83.8)	29.6 (85.3)	30.6 (87.1)	31.6 (88.9)	30.2 (86.3)
Mean daily minimum °C (°F)	23.2 (73.8)	23.6 (74.5)	24.2 (75.6)	23.9 (75.0)	22.7 (72.9)	21.3 (70.3)	20.4 (68.7)	20.3 (68.5)	20.8 (69.4)	22.0 (71.6)	23.1 (73.6)	23.3 (73.9)	22.4 (72.3)
Average precipitation mm (inches)	33 (1.3)	15 (0.6)	56 (2.2)	163 (6.4)	240 (9.4)	80 (3.1)	70 (2.8)	66 (2.6)	72 (2.8)	97 (3.8)	92 (3.6)	75 (3.0)	1,059 (41.6)
Source: WorldWeather.org
