= Mumias Sugar Company Limited =

Kenyan sugar manufacturer

Coordinates: 00°19′58″N 34°29′05″E

- Type: Public:NSE:MSC
- Industry: Manufacture & Marketing of Sugar
- Founded: 1971
- Headquarters: Nairobi & Kakamega County, Kenya
- Key people: Dan Ameyo; Chairman; Rick Ross; Managing Director
- Products: Sugar
- Number of employees: 1,689 (2014)
- Website: Homepage

Mumias Sugar Company Limited is a sugar manufacturing company in Kenya, the largest economy in the East African Community. It is the largest sugar manufacturer in Kenya, producing about 250,000 metric tonnes (42%) of the estimated 600,000 metric tonnes annual national output.

== Location ==
The company maintains its headquarters in the town of Mumias, in Kakamega County, Western Province of Kenya, near the sugar plantations and factories of the company. Mumias lies approximately 395 kilometres (245 mi), by road, northwest of Nairobi. The company maintains an operations center in Nairobi, the capital of Kenya and the largest city in that country.

== Overview ==
Mumias Sugar Company is primarily engaged in the manufacture and sale of sugar. The company grows some sugar cane; its own estates provide up to 7% of its annual output. Its primary source of sugarcane is over 50,000 registered "out growers" with over 400 square kilometres (99,000 acres) under cultivation. It has also piloted the production of a hybrid high-yielding palm oil variety in areas previously thought too cool for commercial cultivation, in collaboration with the UN Food and Agriculture Organization (FAO). In addition to sugar, the company co-generates 34 Megawatts of electricity. Some of the electric power is used internally and surplus is sold into the nation electricity grid. The company also manufactures 24 million liters of ethanol annually and 20 million liters of distilled water every year.

== History ==
The company was founded in 1971, with the following shareholding profile: (a) Government of Kenya (71% shareholding) (b) Commonwealth Development Corporation of the United Kingdom (17% shareholding) (c) Kenya Commercial Finance Company (5% shareholding) (d) Booker McConnel (4% shareholding) and (e) East African Development Bank (3% shareholding). The maximum quantity of sugar produced by the company was in 2005, when output amounted to 269,184 metric tonnes.

== Ownership ==
In 2001, the shares of the company were listed on the Nairobi Stock Exchange, where they trade under the symbol MSC. The table below illustrates the shareholding in the company as at September 2014.

Mumias Sugar Company Limited Stock Ownership
Rank	Name of Owner	Percentage Ownership
1	Government of Kenya	20.0
2	Standard Chartered Nominee Account KE17984	2.31
3	Kenya Commercial Bank	1.72
4	Jubilee Insurance	1.46
5	J Aggrey Hannington LTD	0.94
6	Suresh Varsani	0.60
7	Pradeep Patani	0.59
8	Yana Trading Limited	0.56
9	Ramila Mavji and Harji Mavji Kerai	0.49
10	CfC Stanbic Nominees Account R57601	0.45
11	Other Investors via NSE	70.89
	Total	100.00

== Governance ==
Dan Ameyo, one of the non-executive directors, serves as the chairman of the board of directors. The chief executive officer is Errol Johnson.

== Objectives ==
The major objectives of establishing Mumias Sugar Company were to:

- Provide a source of cash income for farmers
- Create job opportunities since there was no major industrial undertaking in the area at the time
- Curb rural-urban migration
- Reduce over-dependence on importation and aim for self-sufficiency in sugar production
- The Company was also expected to operate on a commercial basis and make profits.

== Recent developments ==
Beginning in 2012, the company began experiencing lowered sugar output and deceased profits, initially blamed on "inefficiency". A forensic audit by the audit firm KPMG, found procedural and financial irregularities which top management had hid from the company's Board of Directors, leading to a loss of over KSh1 billion (approximately US$12 million), by the company. These developments led to the firing of 52 top managers, including the CEO, CFO, Commercial Director and Company Secretary. The company has asked the government for KSh2.3 billion (approximately US$26 million) in bail-out funds, of which KSh500 million (approximately US$5.6 million) had been advanced, as of the first week of February 2015. Legal proceedings against the major culprits in the scam have begun.

On 24 September 2019, Kenya Commercial Bank Group (KCB), which was owed KSh545 million (approximately US$5.45 million) by Mumias, placed the sugar miller under receivership and appointed the consultancy firm of PVR Rao as the administrator.

In December 2021, Sarrai Group was awarded the lease for Mumias Sugar Company as most successful bidder. However, many cases were filed in the Kenya High Court in Nairobi and other places to stop the survival of Mumias Sugar Company Limited as the objective of the lease was the survival of company so that livelihood of 1 million people could be returned. Unsuccessful bidders went to court to suspend the Mumias lease offer to Sarrai Group. The bidder, Tumaz and Tumaz Enterprises, which had placed the highest bid of Ksh27.6 billion against Ksh11.5 billion for Sarrai Group, alleged fraud, mistakes and illegalities in the bidding process, which was headed by Kenya Commercial Bank (KCB)'s receivership manager P V Rao. The Receiver Manager filed documents in the court that Tumaz and Tumaz Enterprises did not even produce the required Bid Bond which is the 1st basic requirement for any Bid and their Bid was disqualified. Mumias Sugar was placed under receivership in 2018 by KCB, which was one of its creditors. Justice Kenneth Ndung'u of Milimani High Court in Nairobi suspended the lease award and ordered KCB's receiver manager and Sarrai Group not to interfere with Mumias Sugar until the case was heard and determined.

In January 2022, other bidders including West Kenya Sugar Company were enjoined in new cases filed against Sarrai Group and P V Rao. A group of Mumias sugar farmers filed another lawsuit challenging the lease award. They protested that KCB's receiver manager had erred in awarding the lease to the lowest bidder. West Kenya Sugar company told the court that it was the highest bidder, and yet the lease was awarded at a cost of Ksh5.8 billion to Sarrai Group. They contested that Sarrai Group was the lowest bidder out of 8 bidders who had submitted their bids. The Nairobi High Court judge Okwany issued a second lease suspension until 14 March 2022, when the case would be heard and determined. The farmers had sued Sarrai Group, P V Rao, the attorney general, competition authority, Kakamega County government among others. In its reply to the suit, the Competition Authority of Kenya told the court that the lease award was fraudulent, because the KCB receiver manager and Sarrai Group failed to get its approval before taking over the lease. They said it was a criminal act as per the Competition Act of the 2010 Kenyan Constitution.

In early February 2022 another round of lawsuits were filed by creditors including the law firm of Kimeto, which is owed Ksh76 million. The law firm claimed that the leasing process was fraudulent because KCB's receiver manager had filed documents in court showing that KCB collected over Ksh1.5 billion from running Mumias Sugar since 2018. They argued that KCB's Mumias Sugar debt of Ksh570 million should already have been credited from the collections which were 3 times the debt KCB was owed. They wanted KCB receiver manager to be fired by the court and a new tender process to be announced and administered by the court. They argued that the previous tendering process had virtually collapsed after a barrage of lawsuits were filed, and effectively stopped the operations of Mumias Sugar.

In February 2022, 500 former employees of Mumias Sugar who occupied the company's houses claimed that they were served with eviction orders by Sarrai Group, despite court orders stopping the eviction without their salary compensation. Sarrai Group's eviction notices were in violation of court orders. These evictions echo of another controversy involving a Sarrai Group subsidiary in neighboring Uganda, in which Sarrai Group brutally evicted 5,000 people from their ancestral lands, prompting a Commission of Inquiry.

On 14 April 2022 the lease award was legally canceled by Justice Mabeya for failure to consider other creditors, for failure to consult the Competition Authority of Kenya, for failure to explain how Mumias would repay its creditors, and for failure to conduct a feasibility study. The Judge further demanded that the administrator step aside and give unrestricted access of Mumias to the newly appointed administrator, Mr. Kereto Marima. The new administrator is to “start the lease process afresh, in consultation with all the secured and unsecured creditors.”

== See also ==
- List of sugar manufacturers in Kenya
- List of sugar manufacturers in Uganda
