= Kilindini Harbour =

Kilindini Harbour Mombasa Port
- Port of Mombasa
- Interactive map of Kilindini Harbour; Mombasa Port
- Location within Kenya Location within Africa

Location
- Country: Kenya
- Location: Mombasa, Mombasa County
- Coordinates: 4°03′19″S 39°39′07″E
- UN/LOCODE: KEKIL

Details
- Opened: 1896; 130 years ago
- Operated by: Kenya Ports Authority
- Owned by: Government of Kenya
- Type of Harbor: Natural/Artificial
- Draft depth: 17.5 m (57 ft)

Statistics
- Annual cargo tonnage: 14 Million year 2020
- Website; Kenya Ports Authority

Kilindini Harbour (Bandari ya Mombasa, in Swahili) is a large, natural deep-water inlet extending inland from Mombasa, Kenya. It is 25–30 fathoms (46–55 m) at its deepest center, although the controlling depth is the outer channel in the port approaches with a dredged depth of 17.5 m (57 ft). It serves as the harbour for Mombasa, with a hinterland extending to Uganda. Kilindini Harbour is the main part of the Port of Mombasa, the only international seaport in Kenya and the biggest port in east Africa. It is managed by the Kenya Ports Authority (KPA). Apart from cargo handling, Mombasa is frequented by cruise ships.

Kilindini is a Swahili term meaning "deep down" or "in the depths" in reference to the depth of the channel. Kilindini Harbor is an example of a natural geographic phenomenon called a ria, formed millions of years ago when the sea level rose and engulfed a river that was flowing from the mainland.

== History ==
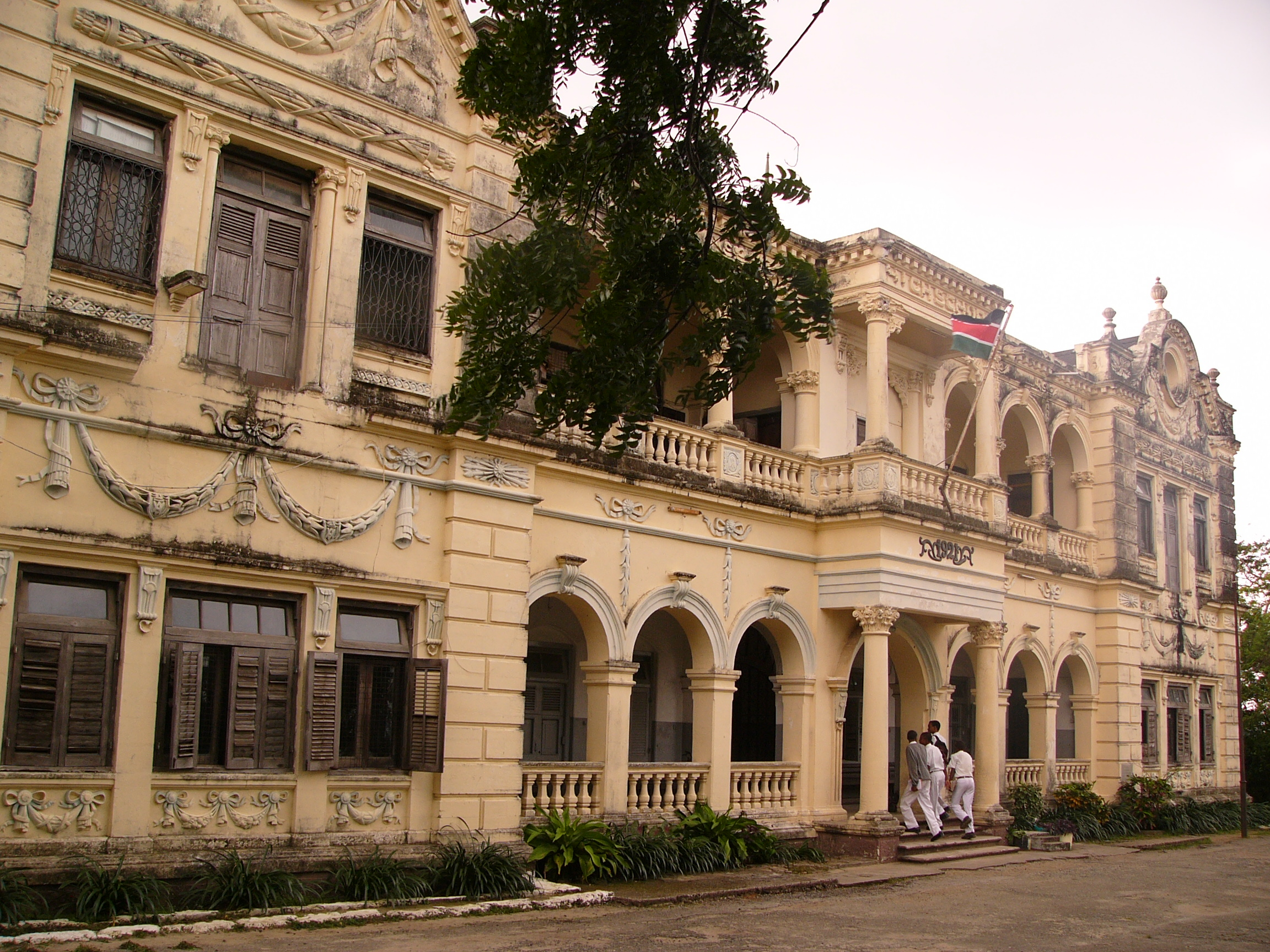
Allidina Visram school in Mombasa, pictured above in 2006, was the location of the British "Kilindini" codebreaking outpost during World War II

Mombasa has a centuries-old history as a harbour city. The Kilindini harbour was inaugurated in 1896 when work started on the construction of the Uganda Railway.

During World War II, while Kenya was a British colony, Kilindini became the temporary base of the British Eastern Fleet from early 1942 until the Japanese naval threat to Colombo, Ceylon (now Sri Lanka) had been removed. Nearby, the Far East Combined Bureau, an outstation of the British code-breaking operation at Bletchley Park, was housed in a requisitioned school (Allidina Visram High School, Mombasa) and had success in breaking Japanese naval codes.

== Traffic ==
According to the Kenya Ports Authority, the port handled 45.45 million tonnes of cargo in 2025, an increase of 10.9 per cent, or 4.46 million tonnes, on the previous year, while container traffic rose by 5.5 per cent to 2.11 million TEU from 2 million TEU in 2024. Transit cargo for the neighbouring landlocked countries, notably Uganda, accounted for 15.88 million tonnes and grew by 19.5 per cent year on year.

== Expansion ==
On 29 August 2013, expansion of the port enabled it to handle Panamax Vessels. The project was launched in July 2011 at a cost of $82.15 million by the Kenyan Government and was carried out by China Roads and Bridge Corporation. A new berth, Berth 19, with 6.1 ha (15 acres) of stacking yard, has provided additional annual capacity of 200,000 TEU. The project is to increase the port throughput by 33%, consolidating the leading status of Mombasa as well as Kenya in East Africa. This expansion came alongside plans to construct railways better linking the port to Uganda and Rwanda.

== Dongo Kundu Freeport ==
The Kenyan Government has also started facilitating the development of a Free Port on a 1,200 ha (3,000 acres) of land owned by the Authority at Dongo Kundu area through public private partnership arrangements. Also underway is the Road Bypass project to link the project area and Mombasa – Lunga Lunga – Nairobi Highway. Known as the Dongo Kundu bypass the projects aim is to ease traffic flow to Kenya's South Coast. Construction is to begin in late 2013. Construction was completed in July 2024 and is now operational.

== Lamu Port ==
A new international seaport, the Lamu Port is under construction in Lamu. Lamu Port is to be larger than Kilindini Harbour but the Kenya Ports Authority says that the two ports won't compete but complement each other.

The port will have 32 berths and dredged entrance channel done to 18 m (59 ft) to enable it to accommodate ships of 120,000 DWT (Post-Panamax Vessels) The cost for the Short-term Plan for Lamu Port Project, including the first 3 berths, is estimated to be US$664 million. The First Phase is to be completed by 2016.

== See also ==
- Historic Swahili Settlements
- Swahili architecture
