= Mwachema River =

River in Kenya

Coordinates: 4°12′30″S 39°29′58″E

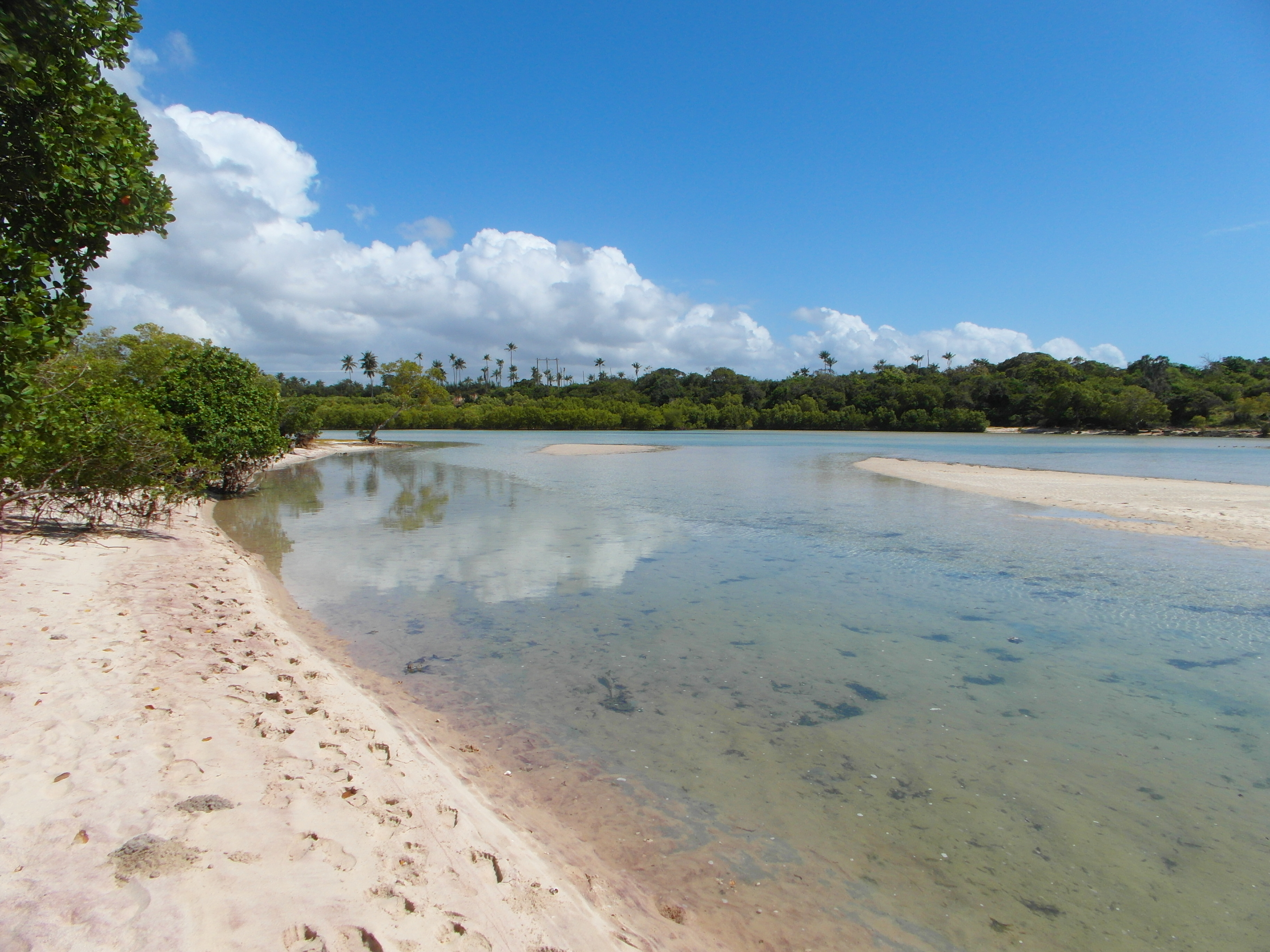
An upstream view at the estuary

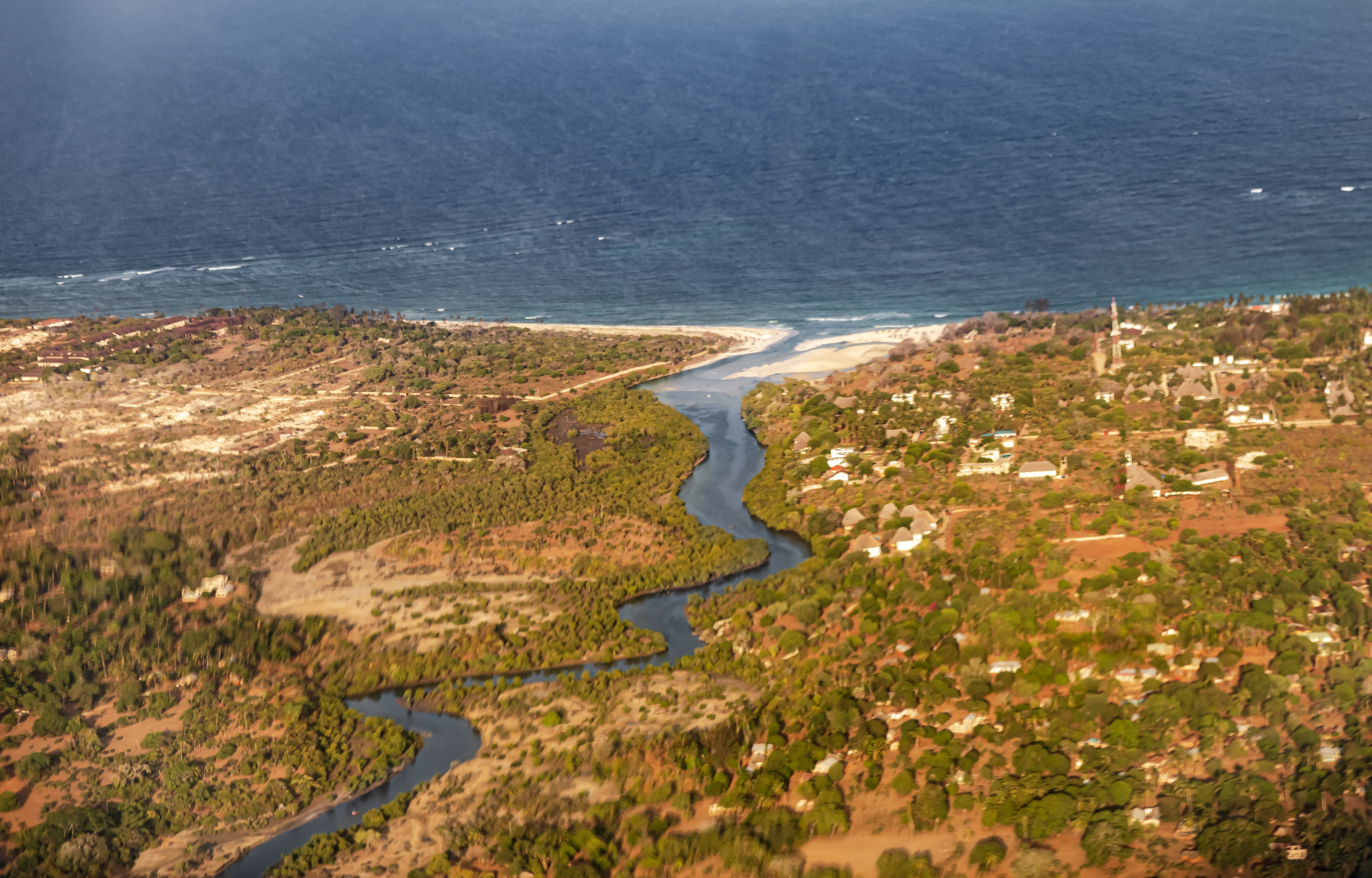
The winding course to the estuary

The Mwachema River, also known as the Kongo River or Tiwi River, is a river of Kwale County in southeastern Kenya, which has its upper reaches in the forested Shimba Hills. It flows into the Indian Ocean at the northern limit of Diani Beach. The Indian Ocean Beach Club hotel in Moorish style and the historic 16th century Kongo Mosque lie near the mouth of the river. Its tidal creek and estuarine system separates Diani Beach to the south from Tiwi Beach to the north, and is fringed by mangroves.
