= Len Gandini =

Australian rules footballer

Personal information
- Full name: Leonard Gandini
- Born: 5 January 1962 (age 64)
- Original team: Kelmscott
- Height: 180 cm (5 ft 11 in)
- Weight: 83 kg (183 lb)

Playing career^{1}
Years	Club	Games (Goals)
1981–85, 1987	Perth	62 (21)
1986	Melbourne	5 (1)
1987–1991	Swan Districts	51 (51)
- ^{1} Playing statistics correct to the end of 1991.

Leonard "Len" Gandini (born 5 January 1962) is a former Australian rules football player for Melbourne in the Victorian Football League (VFL) and West Australian Football League (WAFL) clubs Swan Districts and Perth.

== Playing career ==
After being recruited from Kelmscott, Gandini began his senior career in Perth before trying his luck in Victoria in 1986. He trained with Geelong but was not able to make the team, so he switched to Melbourne. In round 18 of the 1986 VFL season, he made his VFL debut for Melbourne. Despite playing the final five matches of the season, he returned to Western Australia the following season. Between 1987 and 1991, Gandini played 51 matches for the Swan Districts, including an appearance in the Swans' 1990 premiership.
