= Fatuma Achani =

Kenyan politician

- Education: Moi University
- Occupation: politician
- Known for: Governor of Kwale County from 2022
- Term: five years
- Predecessor: Salim Mvurya

Fatuma Mohamed Achani is a Kenyan politician and the Governor of Kwale County from 2022. She had served for ten years as deputy governor and she was Kenya's first female Muslim governor.

== Life ==
Achani graduated from Moi University and became a lawyer and an advocate of the High Court. She worked for law firms and human rights organisations. She was employed by Kenya's Federation of Women Lawyers (FIDA) which is an organisation supporting women and girls in the legal system.

In the 2013 general elections, Salim Mvurya ran for Kwale governorship on an Orange Democratic Movement ticket with Achani as his running mate. Mvurya won by more than half the votes cast.

Mvurya announced in September 2016 that he was leaving Orange Democratic Movement and that he (and Achani?) would run on a Jubilee Alliance ticket in the 2017 general elections. The Orange Democratic Party shrugged off their defection and claimed that they had done a poor job in Kwale.

After two terms as governor, Mvurya was replaced by Achani, as elected governor in 2022. She had a good record as deputy but there was resistance to her candidacy because of her gender and religion. She was however endorsed by Mvurya, William Ruto and her party and she enjoyed a landslide victory. She was sworn in by Lady Justice Olga A. Sewe. She was Kenya's first female Muslim governor. Achani was also among the seven women Governors in Kenya elected in the 2022 Kenyan general election. The other Kenyan female governors include Susan Kihika-Nakuru County, Gladys Wanga-Homa Bay County, Cecily Mutitu Mbarire of Embu County, Wavinya Ndeti of Machakos County and Anne Waiguru as well as Kawira Mwangaza in Meru County. They are known as the G-7 governors.

In 2024 Achani released funds that would supply bursaries to 2,700 students at National Schools. Fatuma Masito noted, as the women's representative, that these bursaries were crucial.

In July 2025 Betsy Njagi and the Cabinet Secretary for Blue Economy and Maritime Affairs, Hassan Joho, opened a new fish hatchery at Shimoni. Invited dignitaries included Fatuma Masito and Achani.
