= Salim Mvurya =

Kenyan politician

Salim Mvurya Mgala

Governor of Kwale County
- In office 4 March 2013 – 25 August 2022
- Deputy: Fatuma Mohamed Achani

Personal details
- Born: 1970 (age 55–56) Kinango, Kwale County
- Party: United Democratic Alliance

Mvurya Salim Mgala (born 1970) is a Kenyan politician and Cabinet Secretary for Youth Affairs, Creative Economy and Sports of Kenya. He became the first governor of Kwale County, Kenya after winning in the 2013 general elections. He vied on an Orange Democratic Movement ticket but later joined the Jubilee Party of Kenya. It was announced on 30 August 2017 that he will be named Chairman of Kenya's Council of Governors. Unfortunately he didn't get to, instead governor Wycliffe Oparanya took over from NANOK. In October 2022, he was appointed the Cabinet Secretary for Mining, Blue Economy and Maritime Affairs Cabinet Secretary.

== Education ==
Salim Mvurya was born at Kadzandani Village, Kinango District of Kwale County. He went to Mavirivirini Primary School in 1979 then Mpeketoni Secondary School from 1987 to 1990. He then proceeded to Egerton University for his first degree and graduated with Bachelors in Agri-Business Management in 1996. He holds a master's degree in Participation, Power and Social Change from the Institute of Development Studies, in England, UK. He also has further certificates in NGO management from MS-TCDC in Arusha, Tanzania.

== Career ==
Salim Mvurya has 17 years of social development and leadership experience. In the year 2008, he was appointed to be the Acting Country Director for Plan Kenya. Other organizations he has worked for include the Aga Khan Foundation and Tegemeo Institute of Agricultural Policy and Development (an institute of Egerton University). Some of the programs he implemented were funded by DFID, USAID, Ministries of Foreign Affairs in Netherlands and Finland, and NORAD, Norway.

== Politics ==
In the 2013 general elections, Mvurya ran for Kwale governorship on an ODM ticket with Fatuma Achani as his running mate. His rivals were James Dena, Kassima Rigga Mambo, Simeon Mwero Mkalla and Mwarapayo Mohammed Mwachai. Mvurya won by more than half the votes cast.

In May 2014, Mvurya ousted Nairobi governor Evans Kidero to become vice chairman of the Council of Governors.

On 29 September 2014 while at a rally with Raila Odinga in Kinango, Mvurya and Odinga were attacked by an elderly man who hit them on their backs with a stick. The security detail at the rally quickly subdued the man who was later released after it was established that he was mentally unstable.

After several months of speculation, Mvurya announced in September 2016 that he was leaving ODM and that he would run on a Jubilee Alliance ticket in the 2017 general elections. His deputy, Fatuma Achani, cited interference from other county chiefs in Kwale politics. Rumors claimed that senior officers in ODM had conspired to deny him the 2017 ODM ticket for his refusal to be loyal and working with Jubilee.

On 30 August 2017, Kenya's Council of Governors agreed to elect Mvurya as the council's Chairman.

After two terms as governor, Mvurya was replaced in the next election when his deputy, Fatuma Achani, was elected governor in 2022. She had been endorsed by Mvurya and their party and she was sworn in by Lady Justice Olga A. Sewe.
