= Beatrice Elachi =

Kenyan politician

Beatrice Elachi Kadeveresia
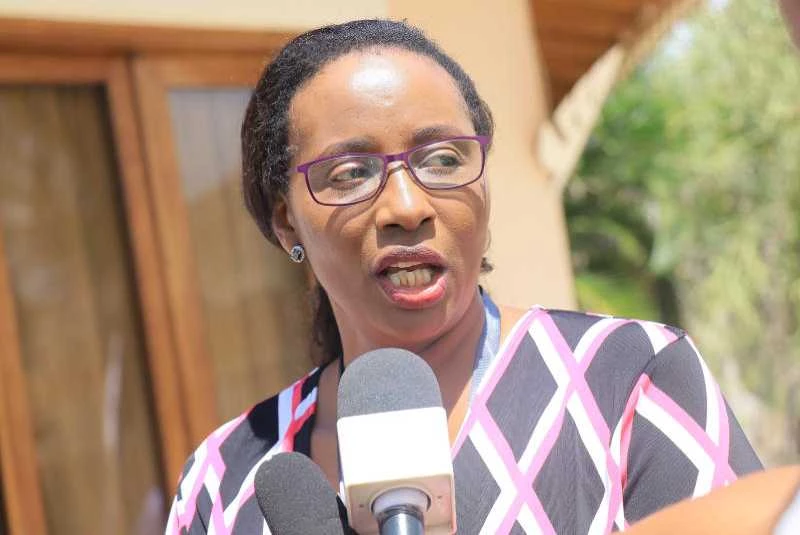

Former Speaker of the Nairobi County Assembly

Personal details
- Born: 1973 (age 52–53) Kakamega, Kenya
- Citizenship: Kenya
- Party: Orange Democratic Movement
- Education: Africa Nazarene University (BA in Peace and Security Studies) (MA in Peace and Security Studies)
- Occupation: Politician
- Known for: Politics

Beatrice Kadeveresia Elachi is a Kenyan politician who currently serves as the member of parliament for Dagoretti North constituency. Prior, she served as Speaker of the Nairobi County Assembly from 6 September 2017 until her resignation on 11 August 2020. As Speaker of the Nairobi County Assembly, she replaced Alex Ole Magelo, who did not contest his seat. Immediately prior to her election, she was the Majority Whip in the Kenya Senate.

== Background and education ==
Elachi was born in Kakamega in a family with four children. She attended St. Teresa's Primary School for her elementary education. She then transferred to Moi Girls Vokoli High School, in Vihiga County, for her secondary education. She was then admitted to Africa Nazarene University in Nairobi, the capital and largest city in Kenya. She graduated with a Bachelor of Arts degree in Peace and Security Studies. She went on to obtain a Master of Arts degree in the same subject, also from Africa Nazarene University. In addition, she pursued the women and leadership program at the European Business Institute of Luxembourg.

== Career before politics ==
Prior to 2003, Beatrice worked as a Programs Officer for the United Nations Program for Women (UN Women), in collaboration with the National Council of Women of Kenya and the Collaborative Centre for Gender and Development. She worked as a trainer of women parliamentarians, in collaboration with the United Nations Program for Women, between 2003 and 2010. From 2010 until 2013, she served as the Secretary General of the Alliance Party of Kenya.

== Political career ==
In 2013, Beatrice Elachi was nominated to the Senate as a member of The National Alliance (TNA). She rose to the rank of Majority Chief Whip in the Upper Chamber, the first woman to serve in that capacity, in the history of Kenya's parliament.

In 2017, Beatrice won the Jubilee Alliance primary elections in the Dagoretti North Constituency, in April. In the August 2017 general election, she lost to Paul Simba Arati, the incumbent.

On 6 September 2017, having been duly nominated, she was elected speaker of the Nairobi County Assembly, and was the incumbent, as of January 2018.

On 6 September 2018, after being accused of (a) conflict of interest, (b) undermining the Authority of the County Assembly Board, (c) abuse of office, gross misconduct and failure to show leadership, she was impeached as the speaker of Nairobi County Assembly.

On 11 August 2020 Beatrice Elachi resigned as Nairobi County Speaker, in a televised address, citing death threats directed towards her.

During the August 2022 general election, Beatrice emerged victorious, securing her position as the Member for Dagoretti North Constituency once again. She was one of six women politicians who were elected who had previously been serving as leaders in their county. The other five were Fatuma Masito, 24 year old Cynthia Muge was from Kilibwoni, Nandi County, Umulkheir Massim was from Mandera County, Susan Ngugi Mwindo from Tharaka Nithi and Linda Sopiarto was from the Kajiado County.

== Family ==
Beatrice Elachi is a married mother of four children but her son, Elvis Murakana died in March 2025, after he was involved in an accident.

== See also ==
- Polycarp Igathe
- Counties of Kenya
- Local authorities of Kenya
