= List of sugar manufacturers in Kenya =

This is a list of sugar manufacturers in Kenya

== Government-owned sugar manufacturers ==
1. Mumias Sugar Company
2. Nzoia Sugar Factory
3. South Nyanza Sugar Company
4. Muhoroni Sugar Company
5. Chemelil Sugar Factory

== Private sugar manufacturers ==
1. West Kenya Sugar Company
2. Sony Sugar Company
3. Kibos Sugar and Allied Industries Limited
4. Butali Sugar Mills
5. Transmara Sugar Company
6. Sukari Industries Limited
7. Kwale International Sugar Company Limited
8. Kisii Sugar Factory
9. West Valley Sugar
10. Naitiri Sugar
11. Olepito Sugar Factory

== Output and market share ==
As of December 2014, the output and market share of each manufacturer was as summarized in the table below: (Note: Totals may be a little off due to rounding.)

Annual Output & Market Share of Sugar Manufacturers in Kenya
Rank	Name of Manufacturer	Output (Metric tonnes)	Market Share (%)
1	Mumias Sugar Company	117,966	19.93
2	West Kenya Sugar Limited	73,696	12.45
3	Nzoia Sugar Factory	66,462	11.23
4	South Nyanza Sugar Company	60,028	10.14
5	Transmara Sugar Company	58,887	9.95
6	Butali Sugar Mills	56,853	9.60
7	Sukari Industries Limited	42,143	7.12
8	Kibos Sugar and Allied Industries Limited	39,415	6.66
9	Muhoroni Sugar Company	38,864	6.56
10	Chemelil Sugar Factory	37,720	6.37
	Total	592,034	100.00%

In 2015, national sugar production totaled 632,000 metric tonnes, the highest production quantity Kenya has ever achieved, on an annual basis.

== Recent events ==
During the first four months of 2020, Kenya produced 193,532 tonnes (213,333 tons) of crystalline sugar and imported another 184,677 tonnes (203,572 tons) to cover the production deficit, according to the Kenya Sugar Directorate. The table below shows the eight largest sugar manufacturers in the country during the first four months of 2020.

Output & Market Share of Sugar Manufacturers in Kenya January to April 2020
Rank	Name of Manufacturer	Output (Metric tonnes)	Market Share (%)
1	West Kenya Sugar Company	57,317	29.62
2	Butali Sugar Mills	31,108	16.07
3	Kibos Sugar and Allied Industries Limited	27,732	14.33
4	Sukari Industries Limited	27,606	14.26
5	Transmara Sugar Company	25,122	12.98
6	Nzoia Sugar Factory	3,832	1.98
7	Muhoroni Sugar Company	3,784	1.96
8	Chemelil Sugar Factory	1,442	0.75
	Total	193,532	100.00%

== See also ==
- Economy of Kenya
