= Bazo =

Bazo may refer to:

- Jeronim Bazo, Albanian military officer
- María Belén Bazo (born 1998), Peruvian windsurfer
