= Likoni Ferry =

Ferry Service in Kenya

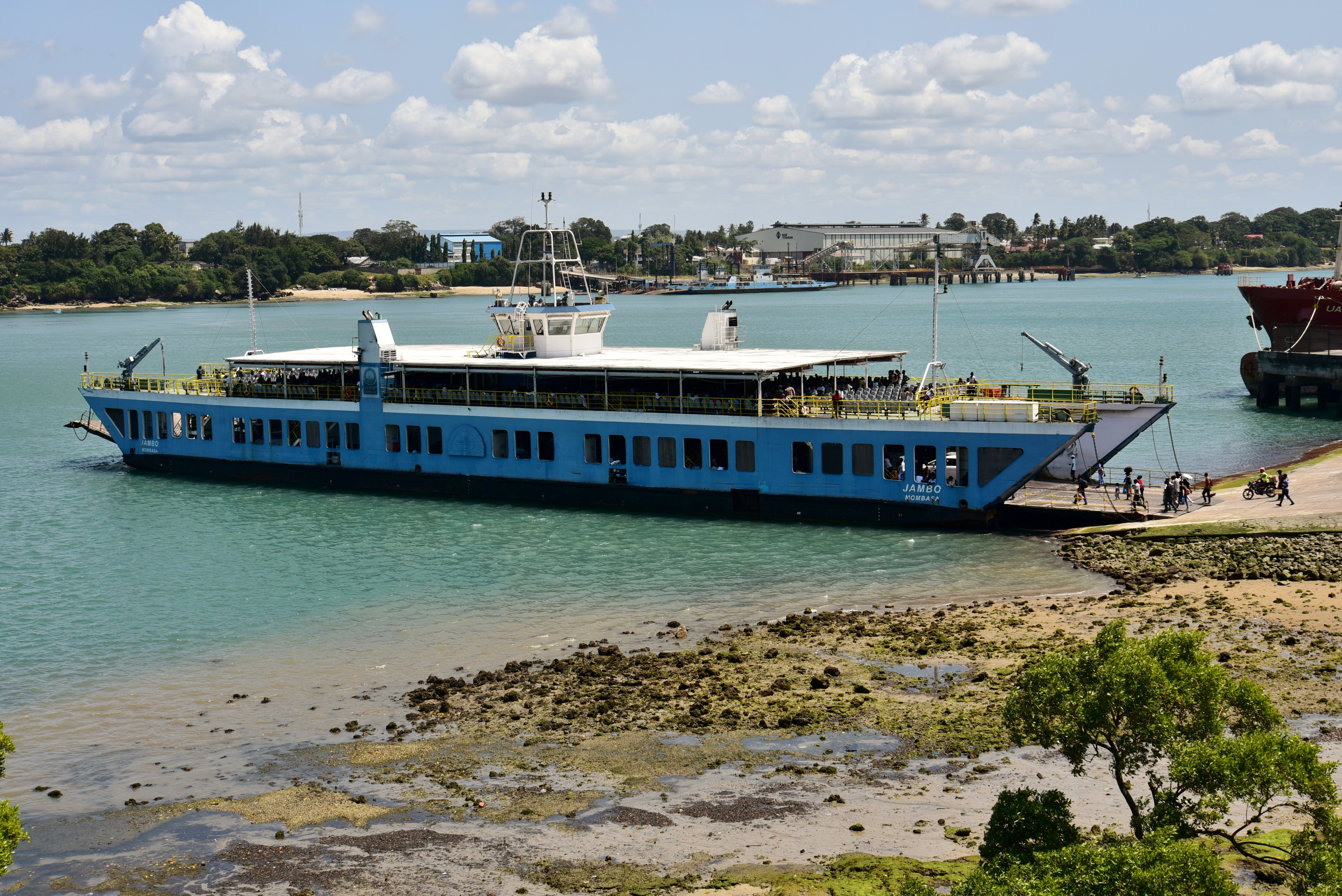
- MV Jambo embarking passengers at Mombasa Island in 2025
- Locale: Mombasa, Kenya
- Waterway: Kilindini Harbour
- Transit type: Pedestrian and vehicular ferry
- Operator: Kenya Ferry Services
- System length: 500 m (1,600 ft)
- No. of vessels: MV Harambee; MV Pwani; MV Kilindini; MV Mvita; MV Nyayo; MV Likoni; MV Kwale; MV Jambo
- No. of terminals: Mombasa island Likoni

The Likoni Ferry is a ferry service across Kilindini Harbour, serving the Kenyan city of Mombasa between Mombasa Island and the mainland suburb of Likoni. Double-ended ferries alternate across the harbour, carrying both road and foot traffic. The ferries are operated by the Kenya Ferry Services (KFS), and is the only remaining ferry service by KFS. The Likoni Ferry began operating in 1937. Passenger services are free; vehicles (including tuktuks, motorcycles, and trucks) pay a toll.

The crossing is approximately 500 metres (1,600 ft).

== Service ==
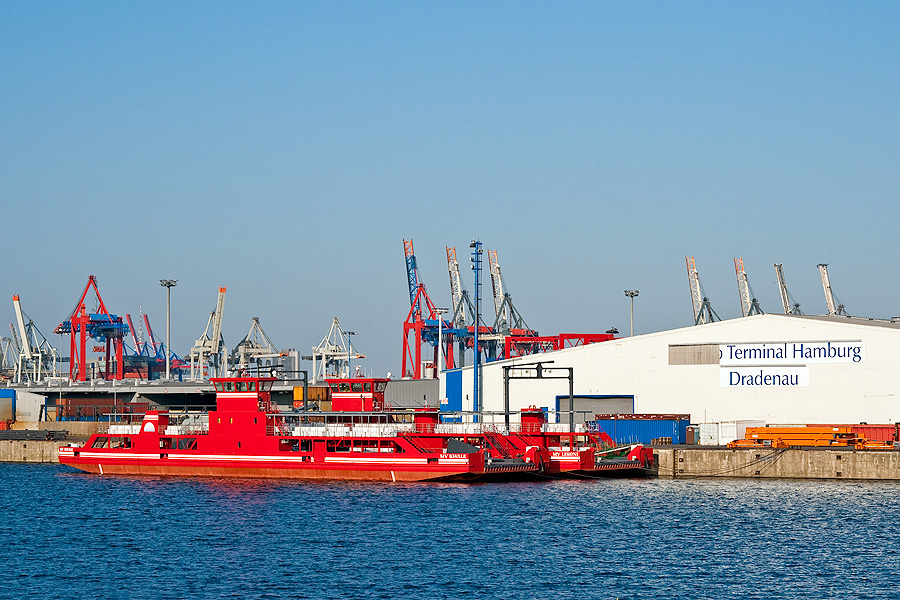
The new ferries MV Kwale and MV Likoni are moored at the Dradenau Terminal in the Port of Hamburg, Germany.

There are seven operating ferries. MV Mvita and MV Pwani were bought in 1969 and 1974, respectively; MV Nyayo, MV Harambee, and MV Kilindini were bought second hand in 1990. MV Kwale and MV Likoni were acquired in June 2010. MV Jambo was purchased from Türkiye in 2020.

In 2010, Harambee, Nyayo, and Kilindini were deregistered from Lloyd's Register for being unseaworthy. As late as May 2011, MV Nyayo was in still in use as the relief ferry.

The Dongo Kundu bypass is planned to ease the congested ferry by connecting Diani and Miritini, bypassing Mombasa itself.

A direct bridge or tunnel from Likoni to Mombasa Island had also been proposed, but the high cost of building them has made these options unlikely.

In 2018, the United States Department of State cautioned travellers against using the ferry due to safety concerns.

== Incidents ==
=== Mtongwe Disaster (1994) ===
On 29 April 1994, Mtongwe ferry bound for the mainland capsized 40 metres (130 ft) from port, killing 272 of the 400 people on board. Following the disaster, it was reported that the capacity of the ship was 300. As of 2005, KFS had compensated 81 families a total of KSh 36,902,472 (US$486,840).

=== Harambee incident (2019) ===
On 29 September 2019, 35-year-old Mariam Kighenda and her 4-year-old daughter Amanda Wambua died after boarding Harambee when their Toyota Isis slipped off the back ramp into the harbour. On 2 October, the rescue team used robots to locate the victims' bodies trapped in the car. On 9 October, the car and bodies were located at a depth of 58 metres (190 ft). They were recovered two days later.

== Fees ==
Motorcycles pay KSh 50, sedan cars pay KSh 120, minibuses pay KSh 600, and buses pay KSh 1,100. Pedestrians and cyclists ride for free.
