= Mwaluganje Elephant Sanctuary =

Elephant sanctuary in Kenya

Coordinates: 04°16′S 39°22′E

Mwaluganje Elephant Sanctuary (MES) is a community-owned conservation area with a size of 40 km², originally designed for elephants and Encephalartos cycads in Kwale County, Kenya. The area is part of an old elephant migratory route between the southern coast and the Tsavo National Parks.

== Location ==
It is located 45 km southwest of Mombasa, below Golini Ridge on both sides of the Manolo River. To the south it borders on the Shimba Hills National Reserve, to the north it is part of the Mwaluganje Forest Reserve.The sanctuary was formed in the early 1990s as a cooperative project between the people of the surrounding Mwaluganje community, United States Agency for International Development, the Born Free Foundation and the Eden Wildlife Trust.

== Ecotourism ==
MES is an early example of community-based-conservation efforts in Kenya, which are very recent trends in eco-tourism and conservation management.

In this community-based program, the local people have stopped farming and keeping livestock in the area; instead they leased their privately owned property to a community-based trust. The trust manages the sanctuary for the preservation of the crucial ecosystem. In addition it is a valuable source of revenue for the local people, through monies generated by eco-tourism and gate entrance fees. Some of the revenue generating activities include creating paper from elephant dung, bee keeping (honey products), butterfly breeding and biofuel.

== Recent developments ==
A multitude of problems led to a gradual standstill of tourism activities in the two last decades: beginning with a reduced attractiveness due to the translocation of 150 elephants to Tsavo East to reduce human-wildlife conflicts (2006), along with poaching, illegal logging and the closure of the Traveller's Camp inside the area (2014). The road network fell into decay, and since Covid, the main gate has de facto remained closed. The sanctuary has survived mainly thanks to the commitment of the Sheldrick Wildlife Trust, which continues to compensate the landowners despite the loss of visitor income; the trust also re-fenced the entire ecosystem (Mwaluganje Elephant Sanctuary and Shimba Hills National Reserve) in 2023/24. Since 2024, the Mwaluganje management has been trying to make visiting the Chitsanze Waterfall near the Golini gate attractive, and to slowly revitalise Mwaluganje as a whole from there. An announcement has been made by the Aspinall Foundation in 2021 that 13 African elephants are to be relocated here from Howletts Wild Animal Park in Kent, UK - but so far it has remained that way. Since early 2025, Kenya Wildlife Service is translocating herbivores (mainly zebras) from other parks to the adjacent Shimba Hills National Reserve; as there is no fence between the two sanctuaries, this will benefit Mwaluganje in the long run, too.
