= Tsimba =

Tsimba is a surname. Notable people with the surname include:

- Cédric Tsimba (born 1984), Swiss footballer
- Freddy Tsimba (born 1967), Democratic Republic of the Congo sculptor
- Kennedy Tsimba (born 1974), South African rugby player and coach
- Richard Tsimba (1965–2000), Zimbabwean rugby player
