= Lunga Lunga =

- Location within Kenya
- Coordinates: 04°33′18″S 39°07′23″E
- Country: Kenya
- Province: Coast Province
- County: Kwale County

Population (2019)
  - Total: 198,423
- Time zone: UTC+3 (EAT)

Lunga Lunga is a settlement and Sub-County in Kenya's Kwale County. It is situated six kilometers from Kenya's border with Tanzania.

== Location ==
Lunga Lunga is located in extreme southeastern Kenya, at the international border with Tanzania. This location lies approximately 102 kilometres (63 mi), by road, south of the port city of Mombasa, the nearest large city.

== International border ==
The town lies at the International border between Tanzania to the south and Kenya to the north. In keeping with East African Community recommendations and guidelines, the Lunga Lunga border crossing was converted to a one-stop border crossing. Infrastructure was modified to allow both humans and cargo to be cleared by Kenyan and Tanzanian authorities at one physical location, in real time.

== See also ==
- Ukunda
- Diani Beach
- Msambweni
