= Kassim Mwamzandi =

Kenyan politician (?-2023)

Kassim Bakari Mwamzandi

Member of Parliament for Msambweni Constituency
- In office 1988–1997

Personal details
- Born: Kenya
- Party: Kenya African National Union (KANU)
- Occupation: Politician
- Known for: Kenyan politics

Kassim Bakari Mwamzandi was a Kenyan politician belonging to the Mijikenda ethnic group. He was KANU MP for the Msambweni Constituency from 1988 to 1997. He resided in Msambweni. Before entering politics at 23 years old, Mwamzandi served as a clerk in the African court. Serving in the regimes of Jomo Kenyatta and Daniel arap Moi, from 1975 he acted as an assistant minister in the Ministry of Foreign Affairs, the Energy Ministry, Water Development and then the Ministry of Public Works. He died on 21 December 2023.
