= Samburu, Kwale County =

Town in Kwale County, Kenya

Coordinates: 03°46′00″S 39°17′00″E

Samburu is a town located in Kwale County, Kenya.

Samburu is pre-dorminantly populated by he Duruma sub-tribe of the larger Mijikenda Community along the coast. Samburu derived its name from the word 'chimburu' which is the Owl.It was mispronounced by the white man when he came across a Duruma elderly man called Bati Kalinga during the construction of the Kenya Uganda railway line in 1897. He was asked through a translator what he was doing in that area, his reply was that, he lived there with many owls(chimburu)...and the white man mispronounced the word to Samburu.

== Transport ==
It is served by a station on the national railway network and the Mombasa-Nairobi highway.

== Note ==
Samburu should not be confused with Samburu County located elsewhere in Kenya, or Samburu National Reserve, located in that district.

== Details ==
- Altitude

== See also ==
- Railway stations in Kenya
- Altitude
