= Dongo Kundu Bypass Highway =

Road in Kenya

Coordinates: 04°22′39″S 39°34′47″E

Route information
- Length: 11 mi (18 km)
- History: Designated in 2015; Completion in 2024

Major junctions
- North end: Miritini
- Kipevu; Mwache; Dongo Kundu
- South end: Ng’ombeni

Location
- Country: Kenya

Highway system
- Transport in Kenya

Dongo Kundu Bypass Highway, also Mombasa Southern Bypass Highway , is a road in Kenya. It connects Mombasa Mainland West to Mombasa Mainland South, without entering Mombasa Island.

== Location ==
Dongo Kundu Bypass starts in the neighborhood called Miritini, on the Nairobi–Mombasa Highway, approximately 15 kilometres (9 mi), northwest of the central business district of Mombasa. From there it loops around the western edge of Moi International Airport and ends at a neighborhood called Mwache at the water's edge, west of the airport. From Mwache, several bridges carry the highway across the Port Reitz Bay to Dongo Kundu on the south-side of the bay. From Dongo Kundu the highway continues in a southeasterly direction until it ends at Ng’ombeni, on the Malindi–Bagamoyo Highway. The entire bypass highway measures approximately 17.5 kilometres (11 mi).

== Overview ==
This road is an important transport corridor for traffic destined to and from Tanzania and that to and from the interior of Kenya and beyond. This will ease traffic pressure on the Likoni Ferry and decongest Mombasa Island. Four bridges will be built in the swamps and across the open ocean water, as part of the highway. Other road improvements in addition to the highway include a 10.1 kilometres (6.3 mi) dual carriageway between Miritini and Kipevu, a road measuring 1.3 kilometres (0.81 mi) connecting Moi International Airport to the bypass which passes west of the airport and clover-leaf interchanges at Miritini and Kipevu. A free trade zone, the Dongo Kundu Free Trade Zone, with 6,200 sites and ability to accommodate more than 10,000 business units is part of the planned development. Kenya National Highway Authority is the developer of the project.

== Funding ==
The engineering, procurement and construction (EPC) contract was awarded to China Civil Engineering Construction Corporation for Package 1 and 3; and to Fujita Corporation-Mitsubishi Corporation Consortium, for Package 2. The three-package project is budgeted at KSh25 billion (approx. US$251 million). The first phase of construction was the Miritini to Kipevu section, budgeted at KSh11 billion (approx. US$110.31 million), borrowed from the Japan International Cooperation Agency.

The construction loans were provided to the government of Kenya by the Japanese government, at 1.2 percent annual interest over 30 years with grace period that expires in 2024.

== Construction ==
The first phase of this three-phase project was completed and commissioned in June 2018. Phase II and III of the development are expected to follow. As of November 2020, phases II and III were ongoing, with completion anticipated in 2024.

In August 2024, the completed road was opened to the public, while awaiting official commissioning. At a later date this and other national highways maybe converted to toll roads if and when the appropriate laws are promulgated. The other roads include: Nairobi-Mau Summit Road, Nairobi Southern Bypass, Thika Superhighway, and the Kenol-Sagana-Marua Road.

== See also ==
- List of roads in Kenya
