= Shimba Hills National Reserve =

National reserve in Kenya

- IUCN category II (national park)
- Location within Kenya
- Location: Kwale County, Kenya
- Nearest city: Mombasa
- Coordinates: 04°15′26″S 39°23′16″E
- Area: 192.51 km^{2} (74.33 sq mi)
- Established: 1968
- Governing body: Kenya Wildlife Service

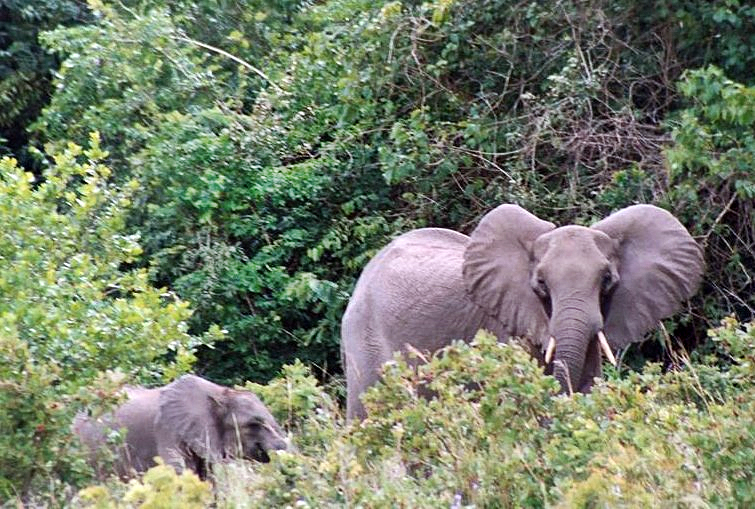
Forest elephants in the Shimba Hills National Reserve

The Shimba Hills National Reserve is a small National Reserve in the former Coast Province of Kenya, 33 km (21 mi) from Mombasa and 15 km (9.3 mi) from the coast. The reserve is an area of coastal rainforest, woodland and grassland. It is an important area for plant biodiversity – over 50% of the 159 rare plants in Kenya are found in the Shimba Hills, including some endangered species of cycad and orchids. It is also a nationally important site for birds and butterflies.

There are estimated to be approximately 700 elephants in the reserve. This population is unsustainably high – it causes significant damage to vegetation, threatening the endangered plant life. The conflict between humans and elephants has also reached critical levels. North of the reserve, the Mwaluganje Elephant Sanctuary has been established to provide a route for elephants to leave the park. The remainder of the park boundary is fenced to prevent the elephants from invading farmland. The Kenya Wildlife Service has plans to relocate up to 400 elephants from Shimba to Tsavo East National Park in 2005.

Shimba Hills contains Kenya's only population of sable antelope. There are about 100 in the park.
