= Diani Beach =

Beach in Kenya

- Town
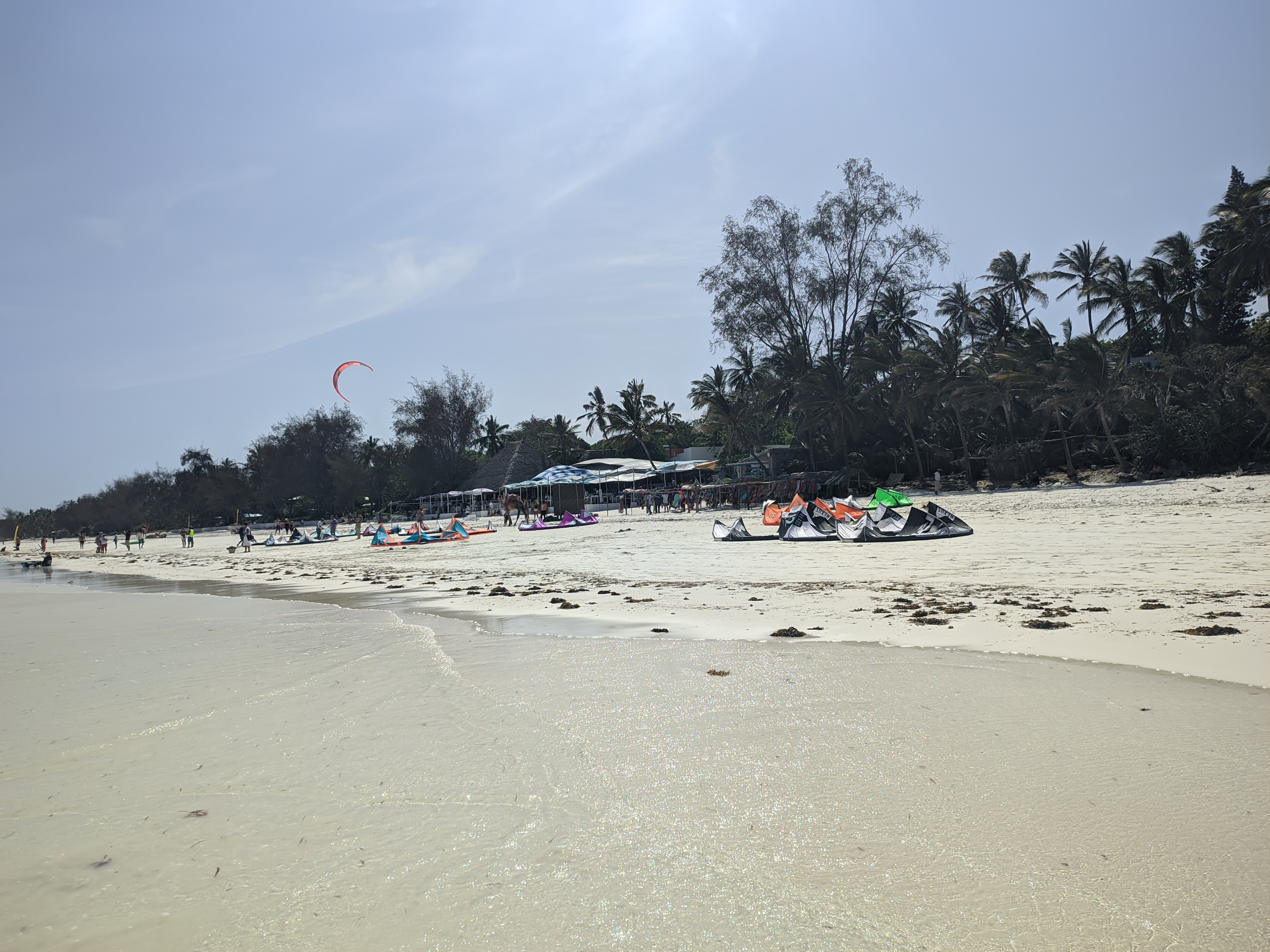
- Sunshine at Diani Beach

- Location in Kenya
- Coordinates: 4°19′20″S 39°34′30″E
- Country: Kenya
- County: Kwale County
- Time zone: UTC+3 (EAT)
- Website: Diani Beach

Diani Beach is a beach on the Indian Ocean coast of Kenya. It is located 30 kilometres (19 mi) south of Mombasa, in Kwale County.

== Tourism ==
The beach is about 17 kilometres (11 mi) long, from the Congo river in the north to Galu beach in the south (the southern point of reference is an old Baobab tree). Diani is a prominent tourist area of Kenya. The indigenous people of the area are the Digo, one of the nine ethnic communities of the Mijikenda. Today the area includes Kenyans of various ethnicities who have migrated to Diani, drawn by the tourism sector. The Ukunda/Diani area had a population of 70,788 inhabitants in 2015. A small airstrip - Ukunda Airport - is located between the beach area and the Mombasa-Lunga Lunga road. The water is shallow near the shore at low tide, with underwater sandbars near the surface which allow wading with a clear view of the sandy bottom out to the offshore reef. Inland from the beach is extensive vegetation (see photo at right), including numerous palm trees which cover the coastal areas. The Mwachema River flows into the sea at Diani Beach.

The 16th century Kongo Mosque is located at the Northern tip of Diani Beach, where the Kongo River flows into the ocean separating Diani beach from Tiwi. It is the last remaining ancient Swahili structure in Diani.

While Diani Beach has been a popular tourist destination since the mid 1900s, it has only been accessible by road through Mombasa using the Likoni Ferry. The completion of the Dongo Kundu Bypass Highway - the Mombasa Southern Bypass - in 2024 is expected to further boost the local tourism sector.

== See also ==
- Historic Swahili Settlements
- Swahili architecture
