= Coast Province =

Province of Kenya

Coast Province Mkoa wa Pwani
- Province
- Location in Kenya
- Coordinates: 3°0′S 39°30′E
- Country: Kenya
- No. of Counties: 6
- Capital: Mombasa

Area
  - Total: 79,686.1 km^{2} (30,767.0 sq mi)

Population (2019)
  - Total: 4,329,474
  - Density: 54.3316/km^{2} (140.718/sq mi)
- Time zone: UTC+3 (EAT)

A map of Kenya showing its provinces

The Coast Province (Swahili: Mkoa wa Pwani) was one of Kenya's eight provinces prior to 2010. It covered the entire country's coastline on the Indian Ocean. Its capital city was Mombasa. It was inhabited by the Mijikenda and Swahili peoples, among others. The province covered an area of 79,686.1 km^{2}.

== Tourist attractions ==
Some of the province's important towns included Kilifi, Malindi, Watamu and Lamu in the north, and Mwandimu and Magunda in the south. Some of the coastal population was located in resort and beach settlements such as Kiongwe and Kipini.

Diani Beach was one of the province's major tourist centres, with palm trees and white sandy beaches like those in Mombasa.

Malindi is where Vasco da Gama picked up his pilot to navigate with the monsoon winds to India; Mambrui appears to be the site where contact occurred with the Chinese during the era of the Yongle Emperor and the expeditions of Zheng He.

Watamu is a small fishing community and contains East Africa's first marine national park, the Watamu Marine National Park.

== Population data ==
- Coast Province population in 1969

In 1969, the total population of the Coast Province of Kenya was 994,082.

This figure is based on the 1969 Kenya Population and Housing Census, which was the first census conducted after Kenya's independence.

The population distribution by district within the Coast Province in 1969 was as follows:

1. Kilifi: 307,568
2. Kwale: 205,602
3. Lamu: 22,401
4. Mombasa: 247,073
5. Taita Taveta: 110,742
6. Tana River: (Data was not immediately available)
- Coast Province population in 1979

The population of the Coast Province in Kenya during the August 24, 1979 census was 1,342,794.

The population data for the individual districts within the Coast Province at that time were as follows:

1. Kilifi: 430,986
2. Kwale: 288,363
3. Mombasa: 341,148
4. Taita Taveta: 147,597
5. Lamu: 42,299
6. Tana River: 92,401
- Coast Province population in 1989

The population of the Coast Province in Kenya during the August 24, 1989, census was 1,829,191.

The total population of Kenya enumerated in the 1989 census was approximately 21.4 million people. The population of the Coast Province was distributed among its constituent districts (now counties) as follows:

1. Mombasa County: 461,753
2. Kilifi County: 591,903
3. Kwale County: 383,053
4. Taita Taveta County: 207,273
5. Tana River County: 128,426
6. Lamu County: 56,783
- Coast Province population in 1999

The total population of the Coast Province of Kenya during the 1999 census was 2,487,264.

The census was conducted on the night of August 24/25, 1999, and the total population for all of Kenya at that time was 28,686,607. The population breakdown by county within the Coast Province was as follows:

1. Mombasa: 665,018
2. Kilifi: 825,855
3. Kwale: 496,133
4. Taita-Taveta: 246,671
5. Tana River: 180,901
6. Lamu: 72,686
- Coast Province population in 2009

The total population of the former Coast Province in the 2009 Census was 3,325,307.

The population breakdown for the individual counties (which were formerly districts) within the Coast Province, according to the official census results published by the Kenya National Bureau of Statistics, was as follows:

1. Kilifi: 1,109,735
2. Mombasa: 939,370
3. Kwale: 649,931
4. Taita Taveta: 284,657
5. Tana River: 240,075
6. Lamu: 101,539
- Coast Province population in 2019

The Coast Provinces had a population of 4,329,474 in accordance with the 2019 census.

1. Mombasa: 1,208,333
2. Kwale: 866,820
3. Kilifi: 1,453,787
4. Tana River: 315,943
5. Lamu: 143,920
6. Taita-Taveta: 340,671

== Climate ==
The climate is designated as Aw in the Köppen climate classification system.

== Economy ==
=== Mining ===
- Kwale mine

== Separatism ==
In 1999, the Mombasa Republican Council was formed, with the goal of engineering the Coast Province's secession from Kenya.

== Dissolution ==
In 2010, a new constitution came into effect which divided Kenya's 8 provinces into 47 counties. The Coast Province was divided into six: Mombasa, Kwale, Kilifi, Tana River, Lamu, and Taita–Taveta counties.

== Villages and settlements (A-L) ==
- Arabuko
- Bengoni
- Boma Upande
- Bubesa
- Busho
- Chanani
- Chengo
- Chevani
- Dambale
- Dida Waredi
- Dungich
- Fanjua
- Galamani
- Galanema
- Ganzoni
- Gasi
- Gimba
- Gifyonzo
- Gogoni
- Golbanti
- Handampia
- Hewani
- Jiweni
- Kabiboni
- Kabieni
- Kadzeweni
- Kadzinuni
- Kaembekaesha
- Kajire
- Kakomani
- Kakoneni
- Kakya
- Kalaluwe
- Kalota
- Kamale
- Kamleza
- Kampi ya Kerengenzi
- Kanjonja
- Kasidi
- Kaufumbani
- Kavuluni
- Kesanguri
- Kibaya
- Kiangwe
- Kibandaongo
- Kibirikani
- Kibuguni
- Kichangalaweni
- Kidomaya
- Kiduluni
- Kiduruni
- Kidutani
- Kidzumo
- Kiembekesha
- Kifumbu
- Kigato
- Kigomberu
- Kigombo
- Kijangwani
- Kijinitini
- Kijipoa
- Kiko Koni
- Kikomani
- Kikuyuni
- Kikwezani
- Kilibasi
- Kililana
- Kilole
- Kilweni
- Kimara Maganga
- Kinagoni
- Kinane
- Kinarane
- Kindunguni
- Kinyadu
- Kipendi
- Kipungani
- Kipusi
- Kirewe
- Kirumbi
- Kirwilu
- Kisaoni
- Kisibu
- Kisimachande
- Kitere
- Kitsantse
- Kituu
- Kiviogo
- Kombo Kombo
- Kongona
- Kulelet
- Kulesa
- Kuruwetu
- Kusitawi
- Kwa Bechombo
- Kwa Bwana Keri
- Kwa Dadu
- Kwa Mkamba
- Kwademu
- Kwaringoi
- Lazima
- Lenda, Kenya
- Lukongo

== Villages and settlements (M-Z) ==
- Mabatani
- Madabogo
- Maduma
- Mafigani
- Magunda
- Magunguni
- Mahuruni
- Majego
- Majoreni
- Majunguni
- Makere
- Makere ya Gwano
- Makinyambu
- Makobeni
- Makondeni
- Makongani
- Makumbwani
- Maledi
- Malibati
- Malka Jara
- Mambore
- Mambosasa
- Manamare
- Manyeso
- Mapfanga
- Mapotea
- Mararui
- Maranu
- Mararani
- Marigiza
- Mariwinyi
- Marongo
- Maruvesa
- Mashanda
- Mashundwani
- Massalani
- Matapani
- Matironi
- Matolani
- Maweu
- Mbajumali
- Mbaoni
- Mbonea
- Mbuji
- Mbunboni
- Mbwara Maganga
- Mdzimure
- Mdundonyi
- Mgamboni
- Mguya
- Midoina
- Mienzeni
- Mikuani
- Milalani
- Milinga
- Minjila
- Mirarani
- Misageni
- Misaroni
- Mitsolokani
- Mizijini
- Mkambini
- Mkokoni
- Mkomaniboi
- Mkomba
- Mkondo wa Simiti
- Mkuluni
- Mlegwa
- Mlimani
- Mnazi Moja
- Mnazinia
- Mnyenzeni
- Mrangi
- Mrugua
- Msabaha
- Msangatifu
- Msuakini
- Mteza
- Mto Panga
- Mtungi
- Mudomo
- Mugome
- Muhaka Mbavu
- Mukunguni
- Mulemwa
- Muliloni
- Mulunguni
- Munguvini
- Muritu
- Mutuli
- Mvindeni
- Mvuleni
- Mwabani
- Mwabaya Nyundo
- Mwabila
- Mwachirunge Bomu
- Mwachirunje ya Pwani
- Mwaembe
- Mwaga
- Mwaketutu
- Mwakunde
- Mwalili
- Mwambiri
- Mwamkuchi
- Mwana Mwinga
- Mwanachini
- Mwanathumba
- Mwandoni
- Mwangoni
- Mwangulu
- Mwanyora
- Mwakinyungu
- Mwarungu
- Mwazare
- Mwazi
- Mweza
- Mwogahendi
- Myabogi
- Nasibu
- Ndile
- Ndome
- Ngambinyi
- Ngombani
- Nguruweni
- Ngutuni
- Ngona
- Ngwaru
- Ngwena
- Njele
- Nkunumbi
- Nyalani
- Nyambogi
- Nyangwani
- Rhoka
- Ria Kalui
- Safarisi
- Saidibabo
- Sailoni
- Samicha
- Samikaro
- Selaloni
- Semandaro
- Sendeni
- Shakadula
- Shambini
- Shambweni
- Shelemba
- Shoroni
- Sungululu
- Talio
- Takwa Milinga
- Thuva
- Tindini
- Ore
- Waldena
- Yedi

== See also ==
- Mombasa County
- Kwale County
- Kilifi County
- Tana River County
- Lamu County
- Taita-Taveta County
