= Kwale County =

- County
- Flag

- County location in Kenya
- Coordinates: 4°10′S 39°27′E
- Country: Kenya
- Formed: 4 March 2013
- Capital: Kwale
- Largest town: Ukunda

Government
  - Governor: Fatuma Mohamed Achani

Area
  - Total: 8,270.3 km^{2} (3,193.2 sq mi)

Population (2019 census)
  - Total: 866,820
  - Density: 104.81/km^{2} (271.46/sq mi)
- Time zone: UTC+3 (EAT)
- Website: www.kwalecountygov.com

Kwale County is a county in the former Coast Province of Kenya. Its capital is Kwale, although Ukunda is the largest town.

Kwale County has an estimated population of 866,820.

Kwale is mainly an inland county, but has a coastline south of Mombasa. Diani Beach is part of the Msambweni division. Shimba Hills National Reserve and Mwaluganje Elephant Sanctuary are other attractions in the county.

== Religion ==
Religion in Kwale County

Religion (2019 Census)	Number
Catholicism	43,624
Protestant	116,453
Evangelical Churches	82.176
African instituted Churches	22,193
Orthodox	702
Other Christian	47,892
Islam	520.160
Hindu	332
Traditionists	7,121
Other	4,703
No Religion Atheists	12.551
Don't Know	715
Not Stated	108

== Distribution and demographics ==
The main ethnic communities in the county include the Digo and Duruma, clans of the larger Mijikenda tribe. It also has a significant presence of the Kamba tribe.

The Digo are the majority in Msambweni, Lunga Lunga and Matuga while the Duruma are the dominant in Kinango. Most Kambas are found in Kinango, Matuga and Lunga Lunga with a significant population in Msambweni.

The county has four constituencies:

- Msambweni Constituency
- Matuga Constituency
- Kinango Constituency
- Lunga Lunga Constituency

Historical population
Year	Pop.	±%
1979	288,363	—
1989	383,053	+32.8%
1999	496,133	+29.5%
2009	649,931	+31.0%
2019	866,820	+33.4%

Local authorities (councils)
Authority	Type	Population*	Urban pop.*
Kwale	Town	28,470	4,196
Kwale County	County	467,663	62,095
Total	-	496,133	66,291
* 1999 census. Source:

Administrative divisions
Division	Population*	Urban pop.*	Headquarters
Kinango	72,027	1,626	Kinango
Kubo	48,769	0	
Matuga	73,377	3,996	Kwale
Msambweni	211,814	55,964	Msambweni
Samburu	91,011	0	Samburu
Shimba Hills	135	0	
Total	496,133	61,586	-
* 1999 census. Sources:

Samburu should not be confused with Samburu County.

=== Religion ===
As of 2019, there were 43,624 Catholics, 116,453 Protestants, 82,176 Evangelicals, 70,805 other Christians; 520,160 Muslims, 332 Hindus, 7,121 Animists; 4,703 from other religions and 12,551 who have no religion.

1. Christian (36.5%)
2. Muslim (60.6%)
3. Other Religions (1.42%)
4. Atheist (1.46%)
Religion in Kwale County

== Towns and settlements ==
- Bazo
- Bwaga Cheti
- Chingwede
- Dololo
- Dundani
- Dzirive
- Golini
- Jambole
- Jego
- Kwale
- Livundoni
- Lungalunga
- Msambweni
- Ufumbani
- Ukunda
- Vikinduni
- Wasin
- Majoreni

== Geography ==
=== Topographical features ===
The coastline in Kwale County stretches for roughly 250 kilometres, which consists of corals, sands and alluvial deposits.

The Coastal Plain, the Foot Plateau, the Coastal Uplands, and the Nyika Plateau are the four principal topographical features of Kwale County.

The Coastal Plain is famous for its white sand beaches. This land formation is made up of eroded reef material, such as coral sand when it is deposited on the inshore side of the reef. Furthermore, this region has one of the most productive coral reefs, including coral flats, lagoons, reef platforms and fringing reefs. These reefs occupy an estimated total area of 50,000 Ha, with stony coral covering 30%-40% of the total reef population.

Behind the Coastal Plain lies the Foot Plateau at an altitude of 60–135 meters above sea level.

From the Foot Plateau, the Coastal Uplands (also known as "Shimba Hills"), ascends steeply, reaching an altitude of 135–462 meters above the sea level. This geographical area consist of numerous sandstone hills, which include the Shimba Hills (420m), Tsimba (350m), Mrima (323m) and Dzombo (462m).

On the western boundary of the county, the Nyika Plateau (commonly referred to as the "hinterland") gently climbs from roughly 180 meters and covers more than half of the county. A basement rocks system lies beneath the plateau, which also contains random reddish sand soils patches. Since the soil in these regions are semi-arid and low-fertile, livestock rearing became the main activity at the hinterland.

Seven major rivers and numerous minor streams form the county's drainage system. The main rivers and streams are Ramisi, Marere, Pemba, Mkurumuji, Umba, Mwachema and the Mwachi River. Out of these seven rivers, three are permanent (Marere, Mwaluganje, and the Ramisi River). All these rivers flow into the Indian Ocean.

=== Climate ===
The county has a monsoon climate; it is hot and dry from January to April, with the coolest months being June to August.

Rainfall is divided into two seasons: short rains from October to December, and long rains from March to June/July. The county's average temperature is 24.2 °C. In the coastal low lands, temperature ranges from 26.30 °C to 26.60 °C; in Shimba Hills, 25.00 °C to 26.60 °C, and in the hinterland, 24.60 °C to 27.50 °C.

Annual rainfall varies between 400 and 1,680 mm.

Historically, flooding has occurred in Kwale County in the central eastern parts of the county which is caused by intense rains. Climate experts and farmers have seen a significant change of climate conditions which have greatly affected agriculture production and the livelihood of the people of Kwale County. Significant increase of heat has led to frequency of drought in the county.

== Agriculture ==
The county has a potential to feed its population and even export food to neighboring counties.However, the county has faced food insecurity caused by low productivity and only 30% of the population in both urban and rural areas are secure with food. some of the reasons for food insecurity in Kwale County include:

- Lack of access to farm inputs such as plants and animals genetic improved materials.
- Pests and Vector control solutions including machinery.
- Lack of available and affordable high quality plant and livestock breeds, husbandry services.

These have led to the farmers in the county to use poor quality of seeds while pests and diseases becomes a threat to production of agriculture inputs.

Beans, cassava, maize, peas, grams and semi-commercial crops, like coconuts and mangoes, are the majority of crops grown in Kwale County.

Cashew nuts, sugarcane, cotton, simsim, bixa and tobacco are cultivated as cash crops.

On the 17th of December (Friday), 2021, the Kwale County opened a Sh130 million wholesale fresh produce market at Kombani, which was co-funded by the European Union and the county government, hoping to ease the selling of farmers’ produce and promote trading activities. The new market also ranks largest, after the Kongowea market in Mombasa, in the coastal area.

== Animal Farming ==
The Nyika Plateau, which receives rainfall of less than 700mm, relies heavily on livestock farming. About two-thirds of the county is covered by the hinterland.

According to the 2009 Census, there were 255,143 cattle, 349,755 goats, 83,133 sheep, and 433,827 indigenous chickens in the livestock population. Zebu and Boran cattle are the most common beef breeds, while Crosses of Ayrshire and Sahiwal cattle are the most common type for dairy.

Despite the large number of livestock, production has remained low due to poor-quality breeds, inadequate husbandry, and high pest and disease occurrences.

== Livestock Off-Take Program ==
In November 2021, the Kenya Red Cross Society began the Livestock Off-take and Cash Transfer initiatives in Kwale County to help livestock farmers avoid severe losses during the drought season.

The livestock offtake programme includes purchasing, slaughtering and distributing livestock meat to local inhabitants.

The price of each cow is between Sh 5,000 and Sh 6,000.

The Kenyan government also launched a Sh40 million Livestock Off-take Programme in Kwale County as a response to reduce loss of animals to drought. Government Spokesperson Colonel (Rtd) Cyrus Oguna said 26,000 people in Kwale who have been affected by drought will get a monthly stipend of Sh3,000 via mobile money transfer platforms to help cushion and enhance their lives.

== Kwale Agribusiness Program ==
=== Background ===
Since 2014, Australian-based Business for Development (B4D) has partnered with ASX-listed Base Titanium Limited (BTL), a mineral sands producer in Kwale County, to initiate programs that support local farming communities in their endeavours to improve the returns from their agricultural activities

Together with the Cotton On Group (COG), Australia's largest global retailer, the Government of the Republic of Kenya, and the local Kwale Government, the Kwale Agribusiness Program (KAP) was established.

The program's purpose is to transition smallholder agricultural communities in the region from subsistence farming to more economically focused, and thus more profitable, farming practices. The main products of this program are cotton, grain, pulses, and livestock, including stock feed.

=== Program Objectives ===
The KAP model has demonstrated that industrialisation of the Kenyan cotton sector is attainable through long-term improvements in farming methods, quality control, productivity, and increased profit margin retention by the farming community.

Over the next five years, the primary objective will be to execute the KAP model across Kenya's cotton growing communities. Through the growth and replication of the KAP model across Kenya, the initiative will contribute to the revival of the cotton sector in Kenya. To that end, the following goals have been set.

1. Kenyan smallholder farmers will have increased voice, agency, and capacity.
2. Farmers have increased resilience through improved food security, nutrition, and diversified income.
3. Established partnerships and contractual certainty delivers increased profits for farmers and global buyers and guarantees supply.
4. Development of new localised cotton processing capacity will deliver increased national support and export of Kenyan cotton and lint.

=== PAVI Kwale Farmers' Co-operative ===
The society's name is derived from ‘pamba na viazi’, the Swahili words for cotton and potatoes. The development of the PAVI Kwale Farmers' Co-operative has provided additional aid by giving the farmers a united voice in discussions with COG and other customers, suppliers, government, and supportive partners.

Through the Ministry of Agriculture, Livestock and Fisheries (MoALF) and the Kwale County Government, PAVI has been able to obtain technical assistance and additional resources. Both levels of government have expressed a strong desire to assist PAVI's agriculture prospects. A stock mill has been built, and negotiations for the development of a cooperatively operated cotton gin are currently underway.
