= Africa Uncensored =

Kenya-based media outlet

- Formation: 2015
- Type: Media
- Headquarters: Nairobi, Kenya
- Co-founder: John-Allan Namu
- CEO: Emmanuel Chenze
- Website: africauncensored.online

Africa Uncensored is a Kenya-based media outlet known mostly for its investigative journalism. Its work includes documentary and feature production, fact-checking, podcasting, training and more.

It publishes its work online through its website and a YouTube channel as well as on other online platforms. Its content also regularly features on Kenya's mainstream TV stations. As part of its commercial dealings, its work has aired on the Maisha Magic East and Maisha Magic Plus channels on DSTV since 2020.

One of its latest investigative documentaries, Fertile Deception, resulted in impeachment proceedings against then Kenya's Agriculture Cabinet Secretary Mithika Linturi.

== History ==
Africa Uncensored was founded in 2015 by John-Allan Namu, Mohammed Ali and Kassim Mohammed, formerly colleagues at KTN, to continue their work of highlighting sensitive stories from Kenya and more from across Africa without running into the constraints experienced by typical newsroom journalists thus the name 'Africa Uncensored'.

== Leadership ==
While Mohammed Ali and Kassim Mohammed have since moved on from Africa Uncensored with the former serving in Kenya's Parliament as the National Assembly representative for Nyali constituency and the latter working for the BBC Emmanuel Chenze is Africa Uncensored's CEO.

== Work ==
=== Kanjo Kingdom ===
One of Africa Uncensored's first major productions was an investigation into the harassment, extortion, corruption and even, in some cases killings, meted out on hawkers and small scale traders in Kenya's capital, Nairobi, by its city inspectorate officers/askaris known locally as kanjo. The documentary, which aired in four parts on KTN in addition to being published online on Africa Uncensored's YouTube Channel in April 2016, triggered an investigation by the Office of the Director of Public Prosecutions and, subsequently, led to the arrest, prosecution and indictment of various city inspectorate officers.

=== The Profiteers ===
In 2018, Africa Uncensored published The Profiteers, a three-part investigative documentary series into the flow of money from the coffers of South Sudan's governments in Juba to individual bank accounts in Nairobi thereby defrauding South Sudanese citizens as well as the sources of funds for the country's then long-running civil war.

The aftermath of the airing of the documentary included media appearances by some of the persons adversely mentioned including a controversial South Sudanese business Lual Malong Yor Jr and Paul Malong Awan, a former Chief of General Staff of the SPLA, in attempts to clear themselves of any wrongdoing. The documentary also drew reactions from South Sudan President Salva Kiir with the president claiming he was actually the one who blew the whistle on the corruption cases highlighted in the documentary.

On Thursday, October 11, 2018, protesters in Nairobi marched in Nairobi and presented a petition to local authorities (the Kenya National Assembly and the country's Ministry of Ministry of Foreign Affairs) calling on them to take action on local banks highlighted in the documentary as being party to the looting and plunder of South Sudan.

Before its publication online by Africa Uncensored, the documentary had been turned down by KTN which had earlier been set to co-publish it.

=== Pandora Papers ===
In October 2021, working with the ICIJ, Finance Uncovered and other news organizations around the world, Africa Uncensored revealed more than a dozen offshore companies linked to then Kenyan President Uhuru Kenyatta and several members of his family in a global investigation dubbed the Pandora Papers. The revelations sent shock waves across the globe and, especially in Kenya, where President Kenyatta was pressed to explain the assets his family had stashed abroad. Later, John-Allan Namu revealed that he was forced to expatriate his family before the publication of the story as a safety precaution.

=== Fertile Deception ===
In March 2024, Africa Uncensored published Fertile Deception, a two-part investigative documentary looking into allegations that farmers in Kenya had been sold soil as well as other substances masked as fertilizer. The release of the documentary started a storm that would see the then Cabinet Secretary for Agriculture, Mithika Linturi, impeached by the National Assembly before he was saved by a special committee of the house. Following the documentary's release, Africa Uncensored was invited by committees of both houses of Kenya's Parliament (the National Assembly and the Senate) to screen it before them and field some questions. The fake fertilizer scandal, as what was exposed in the documentary would subsequently be known, featured prominently as President William Ruto visited the United States on a state visit in May 2024. It resulted in the Kenyan government announcing that farmers who had been sold the fake fertilizer would be compensated as well as the suspension, arrest and prosecution of officials from the National Cereals and Produce Board (NCPB) and the Kenya Bureau of Standards (KEBS).

== Controversy ==
On July 19, 2024, Kenya's Foreign Affairs Principal Secretary Sing'Oei Korir wrote to the Ford Foundation requesting details of the activities undertaken by its grantees in Kenya among them Africa Uncensored. This was after Kenya's President William Ruto accused the American private foundation of funding the youth-led protests in the country that had resulted in loss lives and destruction of property over a period of a month, claims the foundation denied. The Kenya government accused the Ford Foundation grantees of being funded to destabilize the country.

== Awards and recognition ==
In 2019, Africa Uncensored's Elijah Kanyi won the Best Documentary award at the Kenya Film Commission-organized Kalasha Awards. Kanyi was on the awards podium again in 2023 when he was announced as the Journalist of the Year at that year's Media Council of Kenya's Annual Journalism Excellence Awards (AJEA) awards gala, an award that John-Allan Namu had also won in 2019. In 2024, John-Allan Namu's Last Door won the Best Documentary Feature at the Kalasha Awards.

Internationally, Africa Uncensored and its journalists have been feted severally. In 2019, the TRACE Prize for Investigative Reporting was awarded to a five-person team from Africa Uncensored comprising John-Allan Namu, Sam Munia, Elijah Kanyi, Clement Kumalija and Steve Biko for their work on The Profiteers documentary. In the same year, Africa Uncensored was a finalist for the Global Shining Light Award with Sam Munia, Elijah Kanyi and John-Allan Namu being feted for work on The Profiteers documentary.

In 2024, John-Allan Namu was announced as the ICFJ Knight Award winner.
