= 2013 Mombasa local elections =

Local elections in Kenya

Local elections were held in Mombasa to elect a Governor and County Assembly on 4 March 2013. Under the new constitution, which was passed in a 2010 referendum, the 2013 general elections were the first in which Governors and members of the County Assemblies for the newly created counties were elected. They will also be the first general elections run by the Independent Electoral and Boundaries Commission(IEBC) which has released the official list of candidates.

== Gubernatorial election ==
Candidate	Running Mate	Coalition	Party	Votes
Athman, Ibrahim Khamis	Onesmas Habel Chome		Republican Congress Party	--
Joho, Hasan Ali	Hazel Ezabel Nyamoki Ogunde	Cord	Orange Democratic Movement	--
Macharia, Lawrence Kamau	Raphael Omollo Nikodemus		Party of Democratic Unity	--
Malila, Isaac Mutuku	Muhamad Ahmad Bahaidar		New Democrats	--
Mtana, Tendai Lewa	Kangangi, Titus Mutua		Independent	--
Mwarurwa, Abdalla Hemed	Obutu Z.A.M. Osoro	Jubilee	The National Alliance	--
Shahbal, Suleiman Said Saleh	Nzai, Emmanuel Kombe		WDM-K	--
Watsuma, Anderson Chibule	Mwavita, Onesmus Mwarumba		KADU–Asili	--

== Prospective Candidates ==
Suleiman Shabhal is a Businessman while Hassan Joho is the MP for Kisauni. Former KPA manager Abdhallah Mwaruwa had also declared his intention to run
