= Mombasa Mainland Constituency =

Former Kenyan electoral constituency

Mombasa Mainland
- Former constituency for the Parliament of Kenya
- District: Mombasa District

Former constituency
- Created: 1963
- Abolished: 1988
- Number of members: One
- Replaced by: Kisauni, Changamwe & Likoni

Mombasa Mainland was an electoral constituency in Mombasa District of Coast Province. Created for the 1963 general elections, it is one of the three original constituencies of Mombasa District and among the 117 constituencies of independent Kenya. The constituency was abolished in 1986 ahead of the 1988 elections, and split into Kisauni, Changamwe & Likoni constituencies.

== Electoral history ==
Elections	MP	Party	Notes
1963	Mohamed Babu	KANU	
1969	David M. Kioko	KANU	One-party system
1974	Ferdinard Mwaro	KANU	One-party system
1979	David M. Kioko	KANU	One-party system
1983	Joseph Kennedy Kiliku	KANU	One-party system
Mombasa Mainland Constituency dissolved into Kisauni, Changamwe, and Likoni Constituencies
