= Mombasa Island North Constituency =

Former Kenyan electoral constituency

Mombasa Island North
- Former constituency for the Parliament of Kenya
- District: Mombasa District

Former constituency
- Created: 1963
- Abolished: 1988
- Number of members: One
- Replaced by: Mvita

Mombasa Island North was an electoral constituency in Mombasa District of Coast Province. Created for the 1963 general elections, it is one of the three original constituencies of Mombasa District and among the 117 constituencies of independent Kenya. In 1966, the constituency was renamed Mombasa Central. The constituency was abolished in 1988, and consolidated with Mombasa West to form Mvita Constituency.
