= Rashid Bezimba =

Kenyan politician

Rashida Juma Bezimba (born 13 October 1966 in Mombasa County) is a Kenyan politician and a member of Kenyan parliament elected from Kisauni Constituency. He was first elected to the parliament in 2013 on the ticket of Orange Democratic Movement and the CORD Coalition. He lost his reelection bid in 2017 before reclaiming the seat in the 2022 parliamentary election.

== Political career ==
Bezimba started his political career at the grassroot level and served as a councilor of Mjambere Ward. He was first elected in 2013 to the 11th parliament replacing Hassan Joho who was elected the first Governor of Mombasa County. Bezimba served as member of parliamentary committees on Power and Privileges and Administration and National Security. He lost his reelection bid in 2017 to Ali Memza Mbogo of the Wiper Democratic Movement-Kenya (WDM-K). He challenged the result of the election in court but the case was dismissed. His political ally, governor Hassan Joho appointed him political adviser in the office of the governor and remained in this position until he resigned to run again for the Kisuani MP seat. He won the election with 34,747 votes to defeat eight other candidates including Mbarak Hamid of UDA who polled 12, 336 votes to place distant second. The incumbent Kisuani MP Ali Memza Mbogo did not run for reelection to the seat as he was contesting for the governor of Mombasa County.
