= Mombasa Island South Constituency =

Former Kenyan electoral constituency

Mombasa Island South
- Former constituency for the Parliament of Kenya
- District: Mombasa District

Former constituency
- Created: 1963
- Abolished: 1988
- Number of members: One
- Replaced by: Mvita

Mombasa Island South was an electoral constituency in Mombasa District of Coast Province. Created for the 1963 general elections, it is one of the three original constituencies of Mombasa District and among the 117 constituencies of independent Kenya. It was renamed Mombasa West Constituency for 1966 election. The constituency was abolished in 1988, and consolidated with Mombasa Central to form Mvita constituencies.
