= Hassan Joho =

CS for Mining and Blue Economy

Hassan Ali Joho

Cabinet Secretary, Mining, Blue Economy and Maritime Affairs
- Incumbent
- Assumed office 24 July 2024
- President: William Ruto
- Preceded by: Salim Mvurya

Governor of Mombasa County
- In office 27 March 2013 – 15 September 2022
- Deputy: Hazel Nyamoki Katana
- Preceded by: Position established
- Succeeded by: Abdullswamad Sherrif Nassir

National Assembly of Kenya
- In office 15 January 2008 – 26 March 2013
- Preceded by: Ananiah Mwasambu Mwaboza
- Succeeded by: Rashid Bezimba
- Constituency: Kisauni

Personal details
- Born: Hassan Ali Joho; 26 February 1976 (age 50) Kisauni, Mombasa, Kenya
- Party: Orange Democratic Movement
- Spouse: Madina Hassan Joho
- Children: 4
- Parents: Mzee Ali Joho (father); Ummu Kulthum (mother)
- Education: BSc Business Administration and Management; BSc Commerce
- Alma mater: Kampala University; Gretsa University

Ali Hassan Joho (born 26 February 1976) is a Kenyan politician who is the Cabinet Secretary for Mining and Blue Economy in the Republic of Kenya. He is the former Governor of Mombasa County, affiliated with the Orange Democratic Movement (ODM).

He was also elected to represent the Kisauni Constituency in the National Assembly of Kenya during the 2007 Kenyan parliamentary election. On 4 March 2013, during the general election, Joho was elected as the first governor of Mombasa County. In the 2017 General Elections held on 8 August, Joho retained his seat on an ODM ticket, Despite significant politically engineered setbacks. He emerged triumphant by winning with 220,576 votes against his closest rival, Suleiman Shahbal, with 69,322 votes, a member of the Jubilee Party. Joho served as governor of Mombasa until 2022, when he completed the constitutionally allowed two five-year terms. He was succeeded by Abdulswammad Sherrif Nassir the former member of the National Assembly for Mvita Constituency.

== Career ==
=== Business ===
He is a businessman with real estate holdings in Mombasa.

=== Politics ===
==== Parliament ====
Joho joined active politics in the year 2004 and became the Kisauni party chairman for the Liberal Democratic Party between 2006 and 2007. It was not until the 2007 General Election that he was overwhelmingly elected as the Kisauni parliamentary member through the ODM party in 2007. He was elected as a Member of Parliament for the Kisauni constituency and the Assistant Minister for Transport. On 4 March 2013, he was elected as Governor of Mombasa.

According to The Economist, "He is close to Raila Odinga, Kenya’s main opposition leader, and is said to be financing Mr. Odinga’s Orange Democratic Movement party." Joho is viewed as the political kingpin of the coastal region of Kenya.

==== Mombasa Governor ====
Joho campaigned to be elected as the first governor of Mombasa during the election held on 4 March 2013. He emerged as the winner and was sworn in as governor on 27 March.

He won by 132,583 votes, his closest rival, Mr. Shahbal, was second with 94,905 votes. Shahbal went to court alleging rigging, but his petition was denied. He later went to court to block Joho's swearing in.

Candidate	Party	Votes
Abdalla Hemed Mwaruwa	TNA	17,335
Anderson Chibule Watsuma	KADU Asili	2,258
Hassan Ali Joho	ODM	132,583
Ibrahim Khamisi Athman	RC	10,124
Lawrence Kamau Macharia	PDU	1,064
Mutuku Isaac Malila	ND	1,368
Suleiman Said Saleh Shahbal	WDM K	94,905
Tendai Lewa Mtana	IND	9,045
Rejected Vote		2,081
Total Cast Vote		270,763

In his first term, Joho named his first cabinet which included;

- Joab Tumbo - Health services,
- Anthony Njaramba - Tourism and Culture Development,
- Mohammed Abbas - Transport and Infrastructure,
- Binty Omar - Agriculture, Livestock and Fisheries,
- Walid Khalid - Finance and Economic Planning,
- Tendai Mtana - Education and Children,
- Mohammed Ibrahim - Trade and Energy,
- Hazel Koitaba - Youth, Gender and Sports,
- Fatma Awale - Water, Environment & Natural Resources,
- Francis Thoya - Lands, Planning & Housing

The second term in office saw changes in key cabinet positions while the majority of his allies were sidelined for other duties within his government. The Deputy Governor, Hon. William Kingi, joined the newly formed administration, and his capacity widened to take charge of the Education, ICT & Mombasa Vision 2035 portfolio. Joho's manifesto stipulated the tasks he intended to achieve in his governorship. These include fishing, tourism, manufacturing, health and sanitation, solid waste management, roads and housing.

The Second term cabinet included:

- Maryam Abdillahi - Finance & Economic Planning,
- Tawfiq Balala - Transport & Infrastructure
- Fawz Rashid - Trade, Tourism & Investment
- Hazel Koitaba - Health
- Munywoki Kyalo - Youth, Gender & Sports
- Dr. Godfrey Nato - Environment, Waste Management & Energy
- Fatma Awale - Water & Sanitation
- Edward Nyale - Lands, Physical Planning & Housing
- Hassan Mwamtoa - Agriculture, Livestock & Fisheries
- Mtalaki Mwashimba - County Attorney
- Joab Tumbo - Chief of Staff
- Hon.Rashid Bedzimba - Political Advisor
- Binty Omar - Water & Climate change Advisor
- Hamisi Mwaguya - Advisor
- Dr. Nyangasi Oduwo - Economic Advisor

==== Cabinet ====
On 24 July 2024, he was appointed Cabinet secretary for Mining, blue economy, and maritime affairs

In December 2024, Politrack Africa ranked Joho as the best performing Cabinet Secretary with a 67.3 percent approval rating.

== Controversy ==
=== Drug Trafficking ===
In December 2010, George Saitoti then internal security minister in the Kibaki Administration named Joho as a drug baron in Kenya based on a US dossier received from the US embassy in Nairobi. Saitoti presented the dossier to parliament and appealed to the house to give him two months to complete investigations into the allegations of drug trafficking by Joho as Kisauni Member of Parliament. Raila Odinga was also reported to have received the dossier from the then US envoy to Kenya, Michael Ranneberger. In February 2019 Joho asked Interpol to clarify that he was on the list of most wanted drug barons. He has occasionally affirmed that he deals in clean, transparent, and auditable businesses and claims to have been exonerated after thorough investigations.
