= Mikindani, Kenya =

Mikindani Estate is an area within Jomvu Constituency which is mainly a suburban area of Mombasa. The estate lies along the Mombasa- Nairobi highway (A109 road). The estate is surrounded by the Indian ocean and is believed to have earned its name formerly from mikinda, meaning small minazi (young coconut palms) which are believed to have been growing in the area.

The estate has subdivision areas/villages in it namely:

- Kwa Mwanzia
- Amani
- Kwa Ngombe
- Ganahola
- Kwashee
- Staff
- Kijiweni
- Aldina.

Ganahola is the most popular slam in Mikindani. It is the smallest sub-division in Mikindani by size and the largest by human population. It stretches from 'Corner Ya Kwashee' to 'Kwa Hussein Beach'. Ganahola has sub-station names like;

- Mikindani Stage
- Corner Ya Kwashee
- Kanisa Ya Makuti
- Parking
- St. Jude
- Kwa Kitili
- Joycar
- Kwa Make Teckla
- Kwa Paulo
- Kwa Kabaso
- Kwa Make Njoki
- White House
- Holy Base
- Kwa Mbitini
- Kwa Zeina
- Kwa Dili
- Kwa Make Karobo
- Kwa Kulaunone
- Kwa Fundi Wa Mastove
- Big Ship
- Nazarene
- Kwa Ngului
- Kwa Husseni
- Pub Kwa Karisa
- Kwa Kenga
- Beach Ya Husseni

The area has experienced a growth in population due to the industrialization within the mainland. In the estate, transport and communication, businesses, and vast growth in infrastructure is present compared to the way it was in the early 1990s.

== Education and Religion ==
Since devolution, education has been given higher priority in the region. It has several preparatory schools, three government primary schools i.e. Amani, Mikindani and Kwashee, several private owned schools like the St.Kevin Hill Schools, Golden Key School, Nazarene Nursery & Primary School, one secondary school i.e., Kajembe High School and two technical training centers: Islamic Teachers Training College and the Mikindani Youth Polytechnic.

Being a cosmopolitan estate, it is home to people of different ethnicity, with majority being the Swahili. This has seen growth in religion amongst the many faithfuls who dwell in the estate. There are utmost six mosques, one catholic church St. Mathias Mulumba Catholic Church, St Mark's Anglican church, the Jehovah's witnesses Hall, PCEA Mikindani Church, Deliverance Church Mikindani and several more Pentecostal churches. Boasting of a vast population due to suburban growth, the estate has also center location for Hope World Wide Kenya and several children's home like the Baobab Family Children's Home and Grandsons of Abraham Rescue Centre.

== Resources ==
The estate also houses different health centers e.g. the municipal clinic, Latullah medical center, Mikindani Medical, Joy medical center, Catholic Church Dispensary which offers VCT services and also administrative offices like the chiefs office, the surveyors department and the CDF office.
