= Abdullswamad Sherrif Nassir =

Kenyan politician and Governor of Mombasa County

Abdullswamad Sheriff Nassir

Governor of Mombasa County
- Incumbent
- Assumed office 9 August 2022
- Preceded by: Hassan Joho

Member of Parliament from Mvita Constituency
- In office 8 August 2017 – 9 August 2022

Personal details
- Born: Majengo, Mombasa Island, Mombasa County
- Party: Orange Democratic Movement
- Education: Aga Khan Academy, Coast Academy, Lenana School

Abdullswamad Sheriff Nassir is a Kenyan politician. He is the governor of Mombasa County. He was elected on an ODM ticket under Azimio la Umoja, One Kenya Alliance in the 2022 General Election. He earlier served as Member of Parliament (MP) for Mvita Constituency from 2012 to 2022. He is currently the deputy party leader of ODM.

== Early life and education ==
Nassir was born in Majengo, Mombasa County to Sheriff Nassir and Nassim Sheriff Nassir. His father was a former Mvita MP who held cabinet positions in the administration of Daniel arap Moi and as the Coast Region Chairman of the ruling party KANU.

Nassir attended Aga Khan Primary School in Mombasa in 1981 before transferring to Coast Academy. Upon completing his primary school education in 1988, he joined Lenana School in Nairobi. He completed his secondary education in 1992. He graduated from Inoorero University in 2014 with a Bachelor of Commerce degree.

== Career ==
=== Business ===
Nassir is the CEO of Radio Rahma.

=== Politics ===
==== Member of Parliament ====
Nassir ventured into politics in the 2013 Kenya General Elections. He was elected MP for Mvita Constituency on the ODM ticket. He served two terms as MP. While in the National Assembly, he served as chairperson of the Public Investment Committee (PIC).

==== Governor of Mombasa ====
Nassir vied for Mombasa governor in the 2022 General Elections. He won the seat by garnering 119,083 votes.

During his first term as the Governor of Mombasa, Nassir launched a scholarship program, to provide educational opportunities to deserving regional needy students. The county assembly under his leadership allocated Ksh.15 Million to cover for the scholarships.

He is also the deputy party leader of ODM

== Personal life ==
Nassir has struggled with his weight. At his heaviest, he weighed 130 kilograms (290 lb). In 2016 he lost 47 kilograms (104 lb).

He is married with four children – three sons and one daughter.

== Controversy ==
=== Sexual violence against critics ===
On September 25th, 2024, it was widely reported that Nassir and his mother orcherstrated the abduction and use of sexual violence (gang sodomy) to subdue Mombasa based blogger identified as BJK. BJK had been critical of the plunder and excessive corruption carried out by Nassir and his family at the County. Despite numerous sermons by police for Nassir to present himself, he went into hiding, causing a countrywide public outcry. On 30th September 2024, Nassir through his social media blamed the gang rape victim of being a coached witness. Hussein Mohammed, Nassir's right-hand man and also the County Executive Officer for lands, was arrested on 30th September 2024 in connection to the heinous act.

The investigations are still ongoing with the public calling for Nassir and his mother to be arrested.
