= Owino Uhuru =

Village in Mombasa, Kenya

- Location within Kenya
- Coordinates: 4.00°S 39.61°E
- Country: Kenya
- County: Mombasa County
- City: Mombassa

Population (2022)
  - Total: 3,800
- Time zone: UTC+3 (EAT)

Owino Uhuru is a village in Mombasa, Kenya, sometimes described as a slum.

The village's drinking water supply was polluted by lead in the 2010 and 2020s.

== Description ==
Owino Uhuru is a village in Mombasa, sometimes described as a slum.

In 2022, Owino Uhuru had a population of 3,800 people, most of whom live in simple dwellings and work in the nearby ports.

== History ==
From 2007 to 2014, Metal Refinery EPZ operated a lead-acid battery recycling factory near the village. The process included use of a lead-smelter, which leaked lead-contaminated waste-water in the drinking water source of the village.

2015 tests by the Kenyan Centers for Disease Control found villages with lead levels in their blood at dangerous levels. A campaign led by Phyllis Omido saw the factory's owners and the Government of Kenya challenged for compensation in court in 2016. In 2020, the Environment and Land Court awarded 3,000 villagers Sh.13 billion (the equivalent of U.S. $12 million), before the government appealed the decision.

In June 2023, the appeal was upheld by the Court of Appeal.

== See also ==
- Hezron Awiti Bollo
- List of cities and towns in Kenya by population
