= Mombasa District =

Former district of Kenya

- District
- Location within Kenya
- Coordinates: 4°3′S 39°40′E
- Country: Kenya
- Province: Coast Province

Area
  - Total: 294.6 km^{2} (113.7 sq mi)
  - Land: 229.6 km^{2} (88.6 sq mi)
  - Water: 65 km^{2} (25 sq mi)

Population (2009)
  - Total: 523,183
  - Density: 2,278.6/km^{2} (5,902/sq mi)
- Time zone: UTC+3 (EAT)

Mombasa District was one of the districts of Kenya. Its capital and the only town was Mombasa.

By 2009, Kenya was divided into eight provinces, which are subdivided into 71 districts. In Coast Province there are seven districts, Mombasa District being one of them. It is situated in the southeast of Coast Province. It is the smallest in size covering an area of 294.6 km^{2} including 65 km^{2} of inshore waters. The district lies between latitudes 3°56’ and 4°10’ south of the equator and longitudes 39°34’ and 39°46’ east.

In 2013, as Mombasa District, being in existence since the colonial period, was converted into one of the 47 counties.

The district and the town are divided into four divisions namely:

- Mombasa Island – 14.1 km^{2}
- Changamwe – 54.5 km^{2}
- Likoni – 51.3 km^{2}
- Kisauni - 109.7 km^{2}

The district had four constituencies:

- Changamwe Constituency
- Kisauni Constituency
- Likoni Constituency
- Mvita Constituency

Mombasa District lies within the coastal lowland, which rises gradually from the sea level in the east to slightly over 76 m above sea level in the mainland west. The highest point is at Nguu Tatu hills in the mainland North that rises up to 100 m above sea level.
