= Suleiman Shahbal =

Kenyan businessman and politician

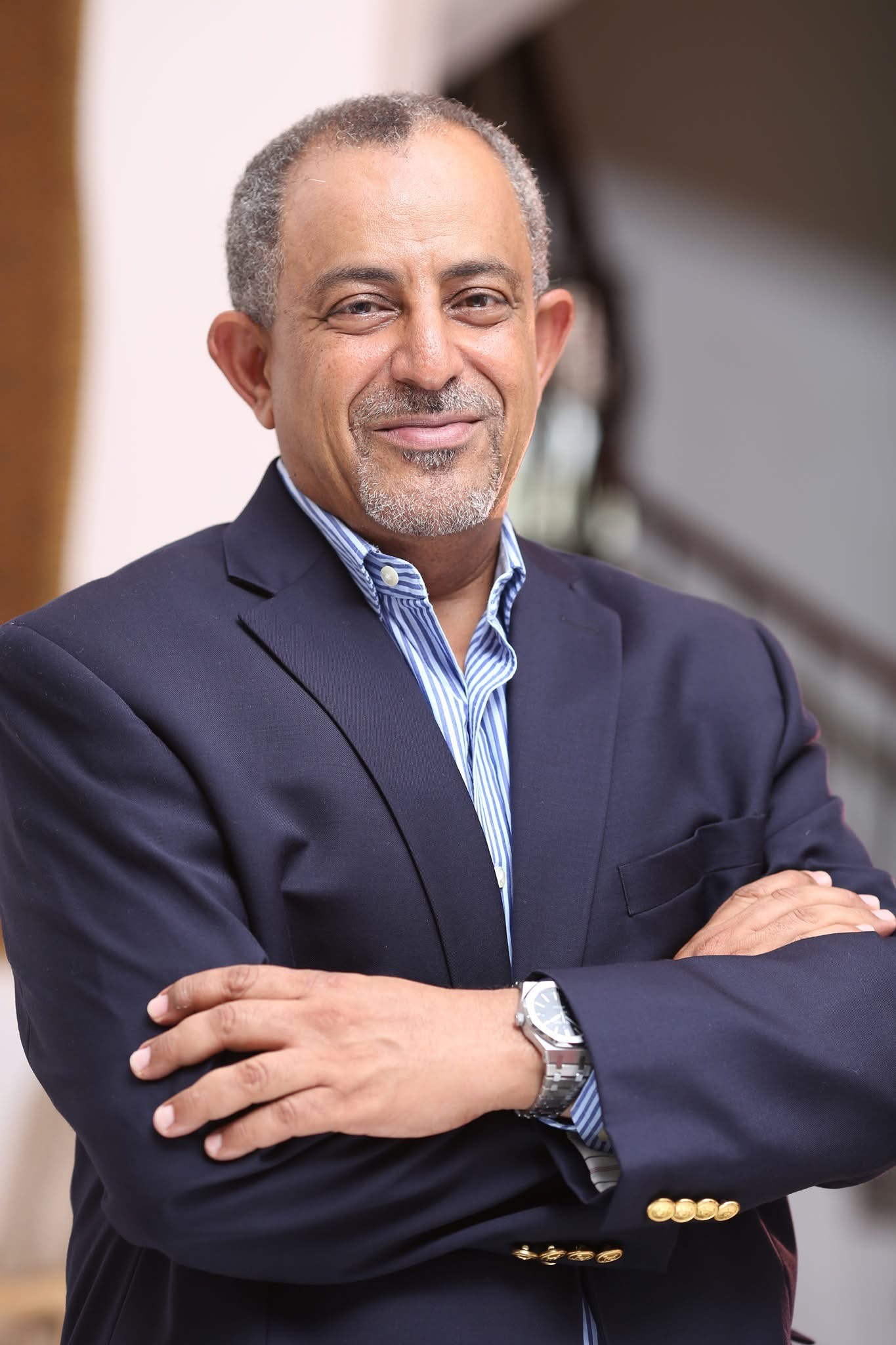
- Suleiman Shahbal
- Born: September 6, 1960 (age 65); Mombasa, Kenya
- Occupations: Politician, Businessman
- Organization: GulfCap Group of Companies
- Political party: Orange Democratic Movement (ODM)
- Other political affiliations: Jubilee Alliance Party
- Spouse: Rahma Shahbal

Suleiman Shahbal (born 6 September 1960) is a Kenyan businessman and politician. He is the founder and chairman of GulfCap Group of Companies, a diversified conglomerate with interests in finance, real estate, energy, and hospitality. He founded the Gulf African Bank, the first Islamic bank in Kenya in 2008. He currently serves as a Member of Parliament at the East African Legislative Assembly (EALA), where he chairs the Communication, Trade and Investment Committee.

== Career ==
=== Business ===
He is the chairman of GulfCap Group of Companies that include the Gulf Bank and Gulf Real estate.

In 2018, Shahbal was appointed by then-President Uhuru Kenyatta as the Chairman of the Kenya Network Trade Agency (Kentrade), a position he held for three years.

He previously held the position of Deputy General Manager and Head of International Operations at Bank of Muscat, Oman’s largest commercial bank. Before that, he served as Vice President at Citibank, overseeing operations in the Middle East and Europe.

== Political career ==
In 2013 Kenya's General Election Shahbal made his first stab in the country's elections by contesting for Governor, Mombasa County but lost to Ali Hassan Joho. He moved to court to challenge the election but High Court judge Fred Ochieng upheld Joho's elections. Shahbal garnered 94,905 votes against Joho's 132,583 votes.

In 2020 he was endorsed by the ruling Jubilee party to vie for Governor of Mombasa county. He, however, in 2021, moved back to ODM ahead of the 2022 general elections. He had defected to Jubilee in 2023 after losing the ODM nominations to Joho. After moving to ODM he opted to step down from the 2022 Mombasa gubernatorial race in favour of Abdulswamad Nassir.

Shahbal had picked Selina Maitha, a sister to former Kisauni Member of Parliament Karisa Maitha, as his running mate ahead of the 2022 elections.

== Education ==
Shahbal holds a Bachelor's degree in Finance from the University of Illinois, has studied International Banking at the University of Colorado-Boulder, and earned a Global MBA from the United States International University.

== Family ==
Suleiman Shahbal is married to Rahma Shahbal. His parents are Said Shahbal and Maryam Al-Bakry.

== Awards ==
- 2023: The Distinguished Honorary Award - Kenya National Chambers of Commerce and Industry
- 2024: Entrepreneur of the year - Pwani Golden Awards
