= Miritini =

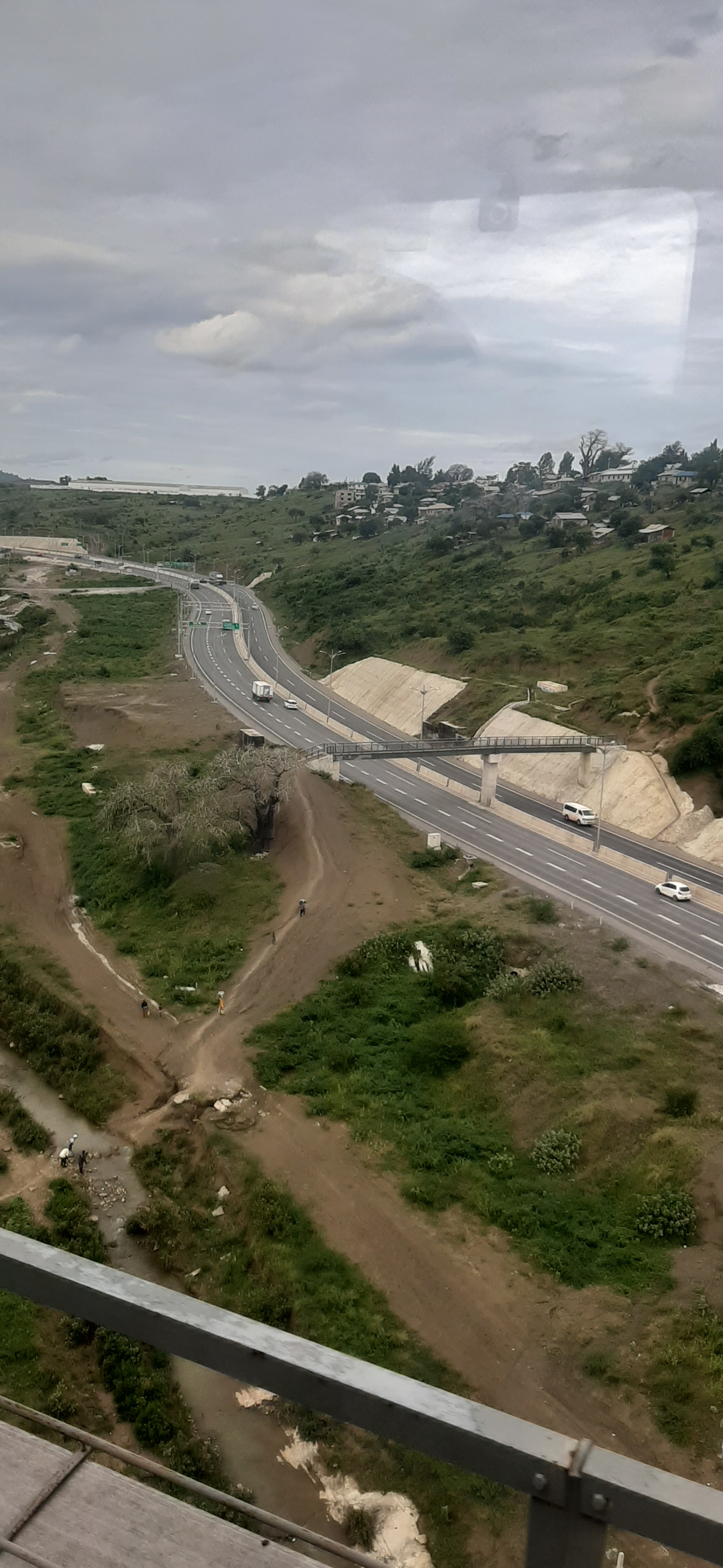
- Road to Miritini

- Location in Kenya
- Coordinates: 4°0′S 39°34′E
- Country: Kenya
- County: Mombasa County
- Constituency: Changamwe Constituency

Population (1999)
  - Total: 31,485
- Time zone: UTC+1 (EAT)

Miritini is a suburb of Mombasa, Kenya. It is one of the three county assembly wards in Jomvu Constituency. It had a population of 25934 in 2011.
