= Omar Mwinyi =

Kenyan politician

Honourable Omar Mwinyi Shimbwa MP

Member of Parliament
- In office 2013–present
- President: William Ruto
- Constituency: Changamwe Constituency

Personal details
- Born: August 1, 1958 (age 67) Changamwe, Kenya
- Profession: Politician

Omar Mwinyi Shimbwa (born August 1, 1958 in Changamwe, Mombasa, Kenya) is a Kenyan politician and member of the Kenyan Parliament. He was elected as a member (MP) of the National Assembly of Kenya in 2013. He has been re-elected twice during the 2017 and 2022 Kenyan general election.

== Political career ==
Shimbwa was elected to represent the Changamwe Constituency in the National Assembly of Kenya in the Kenyan general election of 2013. His election was unsuccessfully challenged in court by Philip Munge Ndolo, who garnered the 2nd most votes behind Shimbwa. He was elected under the Orange Democratic Movement (ODM). He was member of the Departmental Committee on Public Works, Roads & Transport.

He was re-elected in 2017. His election was challenged in court by Mohamed Mahamud Ali, a voter in his constituency. The Election Court upheld the election in a 8 February 2018 ruling. Upon appeal to the High Court of Kenya, a judgment issued on 26 July 2018, upheld his election.

== Election violence controversy ==
In April 2017, during the ODM party nominations, Shimbwa stormed the polling units with supporters and destroyed voting materials that were to be used for the election. On April 22, 2017, he was arrested on grounds of allowing his supporters to assault two police officers at the polling station.

On August 2, 2018, after months of legal proceedings, the Magistrate court found him guilty of the charges that he allowed his supporters to destroy election material and also brutally assault two police officers. He was sentenced to four years in prison or an alternative fine option of KSh. 1,000,000/= (~US$10,000).
