= Changamwe Constituency =

Electoral constituency in Mombasa county, Kenya

Changamwe
- constituency for the Parliament of Kenya
- Changamwe Constituency within Mombasa County

- Mombasa County within Kenya
- County: Mombasa
- Population: 131,882
- Area: 18 km^{2} (6.9 sq mi)

Current constituency
- Number of members: 1
- Party: ODM
- Member of Parliament: Omar Mwinyi
- Wards: 5

Changamwe Constituency is an electoral constituency in Mombasa County, Kenya. It used to be one of the four constituencies in Mombasa district. In 2010, the Independent Electoral and Boundaries Commission (IEBC) split Changamwe Constituency in two, creating Jomvu Constituency.

Before the creation of the Jomvu constituency from Changamwe, the constituency used to have eight wards electing Councillors for the Mombasa municipal council. It had a population of 131,882 people (2019 census).

The current MP of Changamwe Constituency is Omar Mwinyi of the Orange Democratic Movement (ODM).

== History ==
Changamwe Constituency was created from the dissolution of Mombasa Mainland Constituency into the Changamwe, Kisauni, and Likoni Constituencies ahead of the 1988 elections. In 2010, the promulgation of the new constitution prompted a review of electoral boundaries by the IEBC. During this review, Changamwe Constituency was split into the Changamwe and Jomvu Constituencies.

The 2010 IEBC review created controversy in both the Changamwe and Jomvu Constituencies. In the review, Changamwe Ward was renamed Magongo Ward and moved into the newly created Jomvu Constituency. Additionally, Miritini Ward was included in Changamwe Constituency. Residents of Changamwe Ward argued that the name of the ward had cultural significance, as the Wachangamwe were the historical inhabitants of that area. Similarly, Miritini Ward was included in the new Changamwe Constituency despite its ties to the Jomvu area.

Two petitions were filed by residents of the area to revise these decisions. These petitions formed part of a broader set of petitions from around Kenya following this 2010 review. On 9 July 2012, the High Court in Nairobi ruled in favour of the petitioners, ordering the renaming of Magongo Ward back to Changamwe Ward, the transfer of Changamwe Ward into Changamwe Constituency, and the transfer of Miritini Ward into Jomvu Constituency.

== Electoral history ==
Elections	MP	Party	Notes
Changamwe Constituency created from Mombasa Mainland Constituency
1988	Joseph Kennedy Kiliku	KANU	One-party system
1992	Joseph Kennedy Kiliku	DP	
1997	Ramadhan Seif Kajembe	KANU	
2002	Ramadhan Seif Kajembe	NARC	
2007	Ramadhan Seif Kajembe	ODM	
2013	Omar Mwinyi	ODM	
2017	Omar Mwinyi	ODM	
2022	Omar Mwinyi	ODM	

== Wards ==
There are 5 wards in Changamwe Constituency: Chaani, Airport, Changamwe, Port Reitz, and Kipevu. As of 2022, there are 93,561 registered voters in the constituency.

Ward	Registered Voters
Chaani	22,873
Airport	18,557
Changamwe	18,557
Port Reitz	17,817
Kipevu	16,132
Total	93,561
*As of 2022

== Locations ==
Locations
Location	Population*
Changamwe	11,346
Kipevu	44,720
Mikindani	32,485
Miritini	31,485
Port Reitz	54,084
Tudor	27,225
Total	x
1999 census.
