= Mohammad Ali (Kenyan politician) =

Kenyan politician (born 1979)

Hon. Mohamed Ali

Member of Parliament for Nyali Constituency
- Incumbent
- Assumed office 2017
- Preceded by: Hezron Awiti

Personal details
- Born: August 4, 1979 (age 46) Isiolo County, Kenya
- Party: United Democratic Alliance (since 2022); Independent (2017–2022)
- Education: Moi University (BSc in Communication and Public Relations); News Link College of Journalism (Diploma in Journalism)
- Occupation: Politician, Media Personality, Journalist
- Known for: Investigative Journalism, Politics
- Committees: Special Funds Accounts Committee

Hon. Mohamed, Mohamed Ali, popularly known as Moha Jicho Pevu, is a Kenyan politician, media personality and anchor.

He is the current member of parliament for Nyali Constituency in Mombasa County, elected under an UDA ticket in the 2022 elections. He first contested for the seat in 2017 as an Independent candidate and won. He is a former chief investigative editor at Kenya Television Network (KTN). He had an expansive media career, having worked at various stations as a reporter.

== Early years ==
Ali was born on August 4, 1979, in Isiolo County.

== Education ==
In 2000–2002, he attended News Link College of Journalism for his diploma in journalism. He furthered his education at Moi University where he acquired a Bachelor of Science (BSc) degree in Communication and Public Relations.

== Career ==
His media journey started in 2002 at Kenya Broadcasting Corporation (KBC) as a TV producer. In 2003, he moved to Pwani FM as a producer/radio presenter. From 2007 to 2017, he was the chief investigations editor at KTN where he worked alongside John-Allan Namu on various investigative stories. Their partnership, which had Ali doing the Kiswahili stories and Namu the English versions, led them to national prominence. In 2016, he teamed up with ex-KTN colleagues Namu and Kassim Mohammed to found Africa Uncensored.

From 2017 to date, he is the member of parliament for Nyali Constituency and a member of the Special Funds Accounts Committee in the parliament.

He is also linked with MO Radio, which broadcasts in Kenya's coastal region.
