= Operation Lighthouse =

HIV/AIDS prevention programme

Operation Lighthouse (OPL) was an HIV/AIDS prevention programme implemented by Population Services International's India wing during January 2001 to December 2005. It deployed a set of integrated communication, advocacy and service provision strategies to decrease the spread of the HIV/AIDS epidemic among vulnerable groups, by focusing activities in 12 major port communities in India.

== Objectives and Strategy ==
Funded by the U.S. Agency for International Development (USAID), OPL focused on desired behaviour change outcomes in the areas of:

- increased condom usage,
- partner reduction,
- increased Sexually Transmitted Infection treatment and
- increased usage of voluntary counseling and testing (VCT) services.

The program targeted communication activities, mobile or conveniently-located VCT facilities for vulnerable populations, and a ground-breaking mass media campaign targeted to men in Mumbai titled – "Balbir Pasha ko AIDS hoga kya?" (Hindi: Will Balbir Pasha get AIDS?).

== Target Population ==
Considering the nature of the HIV epidemic in India, OPL focused on high-risk adult males because of their potential to infect their wives and girlfriends in the general population. Among this group, medium to high exposure to OPL activities is correlated with a decrease in non-spousal sex and increased condom use with non-spousal partners.

== Geographic focus ==
The campaign focused on the port cities of the states of Gujarat, Goa, Karnataka, West Bengal, Kerala, Tamil Nadu, Andhra Pradesh, Orissa, and Maharashtra. The port cities included: Kandla, Margao, Mangalore, Kolkata, Cochin, Tuticorin, Chennai, Vishakhapatnam, Haldia, Paradip, Mumbai and Vashi.

== Balbir Pasha campaign ==
Through a mixture of outdoor communications, television and radio messaging, and comprehensive newspaper exposure, a fictional character named Balbir Pasha was portrayed in various scenarios, serving as a behavioral model for consumers of Mumbai mass media to relate to, learn from, and empathise with. By gradually unraveling each of the Balbir Pasha scenarios in an approachable and familiar manner, the campaign succeeded in building interest, personalising HIV risk, and bringing the topic of HIV/AIDS into the public sphere.

Indicators of success for the Balbir Pasha communications campaign to reduce HIV/AIDS prevalence in India have been observed as follows:

- increased risk perception among those exposed to the campaign
- increased tendency to discuss HIV/AIDS with others
- increase in number of people accessing HIV/AIDS prevention products and services.

Elements of the campaign that contributed to its "success" include:

- it was based on an in-depth study of the target consumer
- it built up interest through a preceding teaser campaign
- a variety of communication media were utilised
- each phase of the campaign was linked with on-the-ground activities
- the infiltration of Balbir Pasha into street-talk, independent art projects, other advertising campaigns, etc. provided a "hook" for the target consumer to relate to and personalise HIV risk
- although criticised by some for their relative frankness, PSI managed to deliver HIV/AIDS messages in a way that spoke directly to the target consumer.
