= Hezron Awiti Bollo =

Kenyan businessman and politician

Hezron Awiti Bollo is a Kenyan businessman and politician.

== Career ==
In 2022, Awiti Bollo, for the second time, unsuccessfully ran for the office of governor of Mombasa, getting 875 votes to Abdullswamad Sherrif Nassir's 119,083 votes. Awiti Bollo's first governorship bid was in 2017. He previously was the member of parliament representing Nyali Constituency, being elected in 2013 when he was a member of the Wiper party.

Awiti Bollo is the owner of Kenyan company Penguin Paper & Book Company. He is also a landlord of land near the Owino Uhuru village in the outskirts of Mombassa that was rented to Metal Refinery EPZ, the company that contaminated the village's water supply. Awiti Bollo is also the chairman of the Metal Refinery EPZ.

Awiti Bollo owns Mamba village in Mombassa from where he has operated a crocodile farm since 1995. The business has over 10,000 crocodiles that are farmed for their skin and meat. Awiti Bollo owns logistics and transportation company Habo Agencies Limited, and Pili Management Consultants, a commercial and residential property company. Other companies he owns include Gtec, Visan, Benvick Warehousing and Awanad.

== Personal life ==
Awiti Bollo was married to Lucy Adhiambo and was undertaking divorce proceedings in 2019.

== See also ==
- 2022 Kenyan general election
