= John-Allan Namu =

Kenyan journalist (born 1983)

- Born: 23 January 1983 (age 43); Nairobi, Kenya
- Education: Strathmore School; St. Mary's School, Nairobi; United States International University Africa; Aga Khan University
- Occupation: Journalist
- Years active: 2003–present
- Known for: Investigative journalism

John-Allan Namu (born 23 January 1983) is a Kenyan journalist who has worked as a reporter, news anchor, editor and producer and as a trainer and mentor to upcoming journalists and media professionals. He is known for his investigative journalism. He is the co-founder of Africa Uncensored, an investigative journalism outfit operating out of Nairobi, that he co-founded in 2015. In 2023, he announced the release of his memoirs, 'The Joy in the Struggle'.

== Early life and education ==
Namu was born on 23 January 1983 to Arthur and Gertrude Namu. Namu attended Strathmore and St Mary's schools in Nairobi at primary and secondary school level before joining the United States International University Africa for undergraduate studies, graduating with a Bachelor of Arts Degree in Journalism in 2006. He holds a master's degree in Media Leadership and Innovation from the Aga Khan University in Nairobi, Kenya.

== Career ==
Namu joined the Kenya Television Network (KTN) for his internship while in college and stayed on as a reporter.

He was part of a two-man team that formulated and executed 'The Inside Story', a Kenyan investigative TV series that aired as part of the TV channel's prime time news in both English (presented by Namu) and Kiswahili (presented by Mohammad Ali and popularly known as Jicho Pevu). Kassim Mohammed served as their producer on the series. The series featured investigations into current affairs issues in Kenya, from drugs and terrorism to extrajudicial killings and alleged forced disappearances by the country's law enforcement personnel. They aired a special investigation on the death of then Internal Security minister George Saitoti and his assistant, Orwa Ojode in 2013. They had earlier received threats for their work on a tax evasion investigation aired by KTN in the same series.

Namu was also part of the team that produced NTV's 'The County Edition' news program which highlighted news and progress in Kenya's then newly created 47 counties after he moved to the station in 2010 before leaving for KTN again 2 years later. He co-hosted the show on weekends with Yvonne Okwara.

In 2015, together with Mohammad Ali and Kassim Mohammed, he left KTN to cofound Africa Uncensored, an investigative journalism outfit. Their first major series at their new outfit, dubbed "Kanjo Kingdom" highlighted the plight of hawkers in Nairobi and led to the arrest and prosecution of the perpetrators caught on tape and aired in the series.

In 2021, alongside other partners and Africa Uncensored, he launched Shahara, an online streaming platform meant for creatives in Kenya to boost their incomes in the wake of the pandemic. Renowned Kenyan boy band Sauti Sol were announced as "creative co-founders" of Shahara in 2022.

Namu has teamed up with Multichoice Africa for a series of human-interest stories on Maisha Mkanda and true-crime on the Last Door which have aired on the satellite broadcaster's Maisha Magic Plus channel as well as streamed on its video on-demand platform Showmax. Namu also serves on the Reuters Institute Advisory Board.

In 2024, Namu and his Africa Uncensored team have been on the spotlight over their coverage of the fake fertilizer scandal in Kenya in a documentary that unearthed the scam. The revelations in the documentary resulted in a parliamentary probe that saw Namu and his team appear before the Senate and National Assembly committees on Agriculture and resulted in the passing of an impeachment motion against Agriculture Cabinet Secretary Mithika Linturi by the National Assembly before a special parliamentary committee exonerated him from any wrongdoing.

== Awards ==
In 2009, Namu was announced as the CNN/Multichoice African Journalist of the Year.

Namu was a finalist in the Global Shining Light Award in 2019 and was feted for his work on The Profiteers, a three-part documentary series that he produced in 2018 that looked at the illicit financial flow in South Sudan. In the same year, he also won the 2019 TRACE Prize for Investigative Reporting.

In 2022, Namu was named the Human Rights Defender of the Year in Kenya by the Working Group on Human Rights Defenders and the Defenders Coalition. In 2015, he was awarded as the Journalist of the Year and shared the award again in 2017 and 2019.

In 2024, alongside investigative journalists Valeriya Yegoshyna from Ukraine and Rana Sabbagh from Jordan, Namu was awarded the ICFJ Knight International Journalism Award.

== Personal life ==
Namu is married to Sheena Makena and together they have four children.
