= Badi Twalib =

Kenyan politician

Member of Parliament
- Incumbent
- Assumed office 2013
- Constituency: Jomvu Constituency

Personal details
- Party: Orange Democratic Movement (ODM)
- Committees: Regional Integration, Joint Parliamentary Broadcasting and Library

Badi Twalib is a Kenyan politician and member of the Kenyan parliament elected from Jomvu constituency on the ticket of Orange Democratic Movement (ODM). First elected to the 11th parliament in 2013, he serves on the parliamentary committees of Regional Integration and Joint Parliamentary Broadcasting and Library.
