= Najib Balala =

Kenyan politician

- نجيب بالعلا
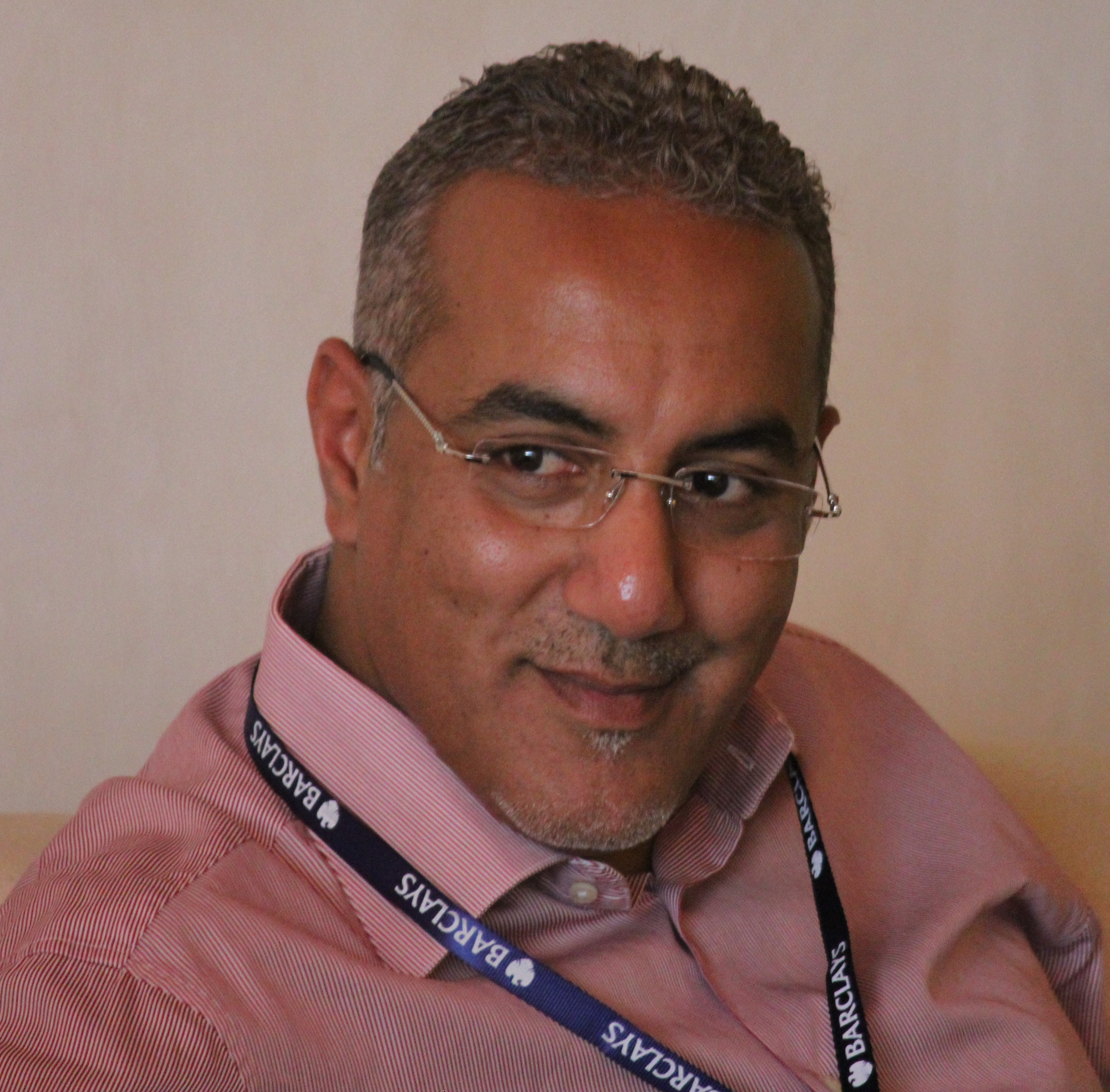

Cabinet Secretary for Tourism
- In office 15 May 2013 – 27 October 2022
- President: Uhuru Kenyatta

Minister for Tourism
- In office 2008 – March 2012
- President: Mwai Kibaki
- Succeeded by: Danson Mwazo

Member of Parliament for Mvita Constituency
- In office 2003–2013
- Preceded by: Shariff Nassir
- Succeeded by: Abdulswamad Nassir

Personal details
- Born: 20 September 1967 (age 58) Mombasa, Kenya
- Party: Republican Congress
- Spouse: Najaah
- Children: 4
- Education: US International University
- Website: www.najibbalala.com

Najib Balala (born 20 September 1967) is a Kenyan politician who formerly served as the Cabinet Secretary for Tourism. He traces his ancestral origin to the Hadhrami people of Yemen. He is a former M.P. for Mvita Constituency and leader of The Republican Congress Party of Kenya (RC), a partner of the Jubilee Coalition.

== Early life and education ==
Born to a Hadhrami family, Balala attended Serani Boys primary school, and Kakamega High School, a national school. He studied Business Administration and International Urban Management and Leadership at the University of Toronto, and the John F. Kennedy School of Government at Harvard University.

== Experience and career ==
- Prior to venturing into public life, Najib Balala worked in private sector tourism, and eventually joined a family tea and coffee trading business
- Secretary of The Swahili Cultural Centre (1993–1996)
- Chairman of Coast Tourist Association (1996–1999)
- Mayor of Mombasa (1998–1999)
- Chairman, Chamber of Commerce and Industry (Mombasa Chapter) (2000–2003)
- Member of Parliament for Mvita Constituency (27 Dec 2002 – 15 Dec 2007)
- Minister for Gender, Sports, Culture and Social Services (7 Jan 2003 – 31 June 2004)
- Acting Minister for Labour (Jan – June 2003)
- Minister for National Heritage (31 June – 21 Nov 2005)
- Member of Parliament for Mvita Constituency (27 Dec 2007 – 15 Jan 2013)
- Chairman of the UNWTO Executive Council (11 Nov 2011 – March 2012)
- Minister for Tourism (17 Apr 2008 – 26 March 2012)
- Cabinet Secretary for Mining (15 May 2013 – June 2015)
- Cabinet Secretary for Tourism (June 2015 to 2022)

== Politics ==
Balala began his political career as the Mayor of Mombasa, Kenya. He was then elected to a Mvita parliamentary seat in the 2002 general elections. Prior to that, Balala served as vice-chairman of Kenya Tourism Board (KTB), Chairman of All Local Government Association of Kenya, and Chairman of Mombasa and Coast Tourist Association.

Balala was the longest serving Minister for Tourism, a position he held from the beginning of 2008 until 26 March 2012, when he was dismissed during a cabinet reshuffle. He formed The Republican Congress Party of Kenya (RC) in April 2012 that became a principal partner in the Jubilee Coalition with President Uhuru Kenyatta (TNA), William Samoei Ruto (URP), and Charity Ngilu (Narc).

As Cabinet Secretary for Mining, he revoked licenses issued by the previous government. He has been accused of corruption by Cortec Mining for requesting a bribe of nearly $1 million for the reissuing of the license.

In December 2023, he, along with former principal secretary Leah Addah Gwiyo, and managing partner of West Consults John Odero, were accused of inflating the cost of the project to build a tourism college and arrested. He was the first former minister to be arrested on corruption charges since William Ruto was elected in 2022 on a platform of fighting corruption.

== Honors and awards ==
- Silver Star Medal by President
- E.G.H (Elder of Golden Heart) Medal by President
- Africa Tourism Minister 2009.
- Best African Minister for Tourism 2010.
- Vice-president UNWTO World Tourism Organization
- Chairman UNWTO World Tourism Organization.
- World Travel and Tourism Council WTT Global Champion.
