= List of Kenyan counties by Human Development Index =

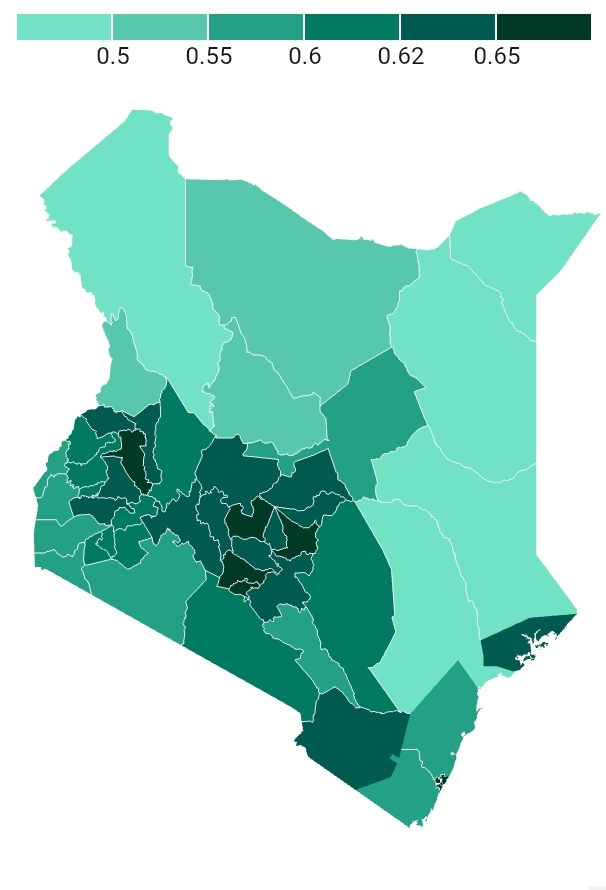
Counties of Kenya by Human Development Index

This is a list of counties in Kenya ranked according to the Human Development Index (HDI) for the year 2023. The highest HDI was recorded in Nairobi County (0.771), while Mandera County registered the lowest value (0.548). Kenya's national HDI stood at 0.602 in 2023, classifying it within the medium human development category. Regionally, the Mount Kenya region exhibited the highest overall development, whereas North Eastern region and North Rift region displayed the lowest levels of human development.

== Counties ==
Kenyan Counties by Human Development Index
Rank	∆	County	HDI (2023)	Growth
High Human Development (≥ 0.7)
1	Steady	Nairobi	0.771	▲2.69
Medium Human development (≥ 0.55)
2	▲ (1)	Mombasa	0.698	▲0.71
3	▼ (1)	Nyeri	0.678	▼0.05
4	Steady	Kiambu	0.663	▲0.28
5	Steady	Uasin Gishu	0.654	▲0.51
6	▲ (1)	Embu	0.650	▲0.83
7	Steady	Kirinyaga	0.646	▲0.66
8	Steady	Nakuru	0.641	▲0.74
9	▲ (5)	Nyandarua	0.637	▲1.17
10	▲ (1)	Laikipia	0.635	▲0.76
11	▲ (5)	Machakos	0.633	▲1.17
12	▼ (2)	Meru	0.632	▲0.59
13	▲ (2)	Taita Taveta	0.630	▲0.92
14	▲ (3)	Nandi	0.627	▲0.97
15	▼ (3)	Tharaka Nithi	0.626	▲0.61
16	▲ (2)	Murang'a	0.625	▲0.92
17	▲ (4)	Kisumu	0.621	▲1.02
18	▲ (4)	Elgeyo-Marakwet	0.620	▲0.99
19	▼ (10)	Lamu	0.620	▲0.10
20	▼ (7)	Trans Nzoia	0.620	▲0.49
21	▲ (4)	Kericho	0.619	▲1.30
22	▼ (2)	Bungoma	0.618	▲0.87
23	▼ (4)	Nyamira	0.616	▲0.60
24	▲ (3)	Bomet	0.613	▲1.34
25	▼ (1)	Kisii	0.613	▲0.83
26	▼ (3)	Baringo	0.609	▲0.59
27	▲ (2)	Kajiado	0.609	▲1.28
28	▼ (2)	Kakamega	0.606	▲0.81
29	▲ (2)	Kitui	0.602	▲1.29
30	▼ (2)	Vihiga	0.602	▲0.95
31	▲ (1)	Makueni	0.595	▲1.33
32	▼ (2)	Busia	0.594	▲0.83
33	▲ (6)	Siaya	0.583	▲1.79
34	▼ (1)	Narok	0.578	▲0.86
35	▲ (2)	Kilifi	0.574	▲1.23
36	▲ (7)	Homa Bay	0.573	▲1.78
37	▲ (1)	Kwale	0.573	▲1.30
38	▲ (4)	Migori	0.567	▲1.47
39	▼ (3)	Isiolo	0.554	▲0.30
Low Human development (< 0.55)
40	Steady	West Pokot	0.534	▼0.23
41	▼ (7)	Marsabit	0.522	▼1.60
42	▼ (7)	Samburu	0.509	▼2.00
43	▼ (1)	Tana River	0.497	▼0.78
44	▲ (1)	Garissa	0.494	▲0.96
45	▼ (4)	Turkana	0.492	▼2.14
46	Steady	Wajir	0.491	▲1.06
47	Steady	Mandera	0.484	▲0.76

== Regions ==
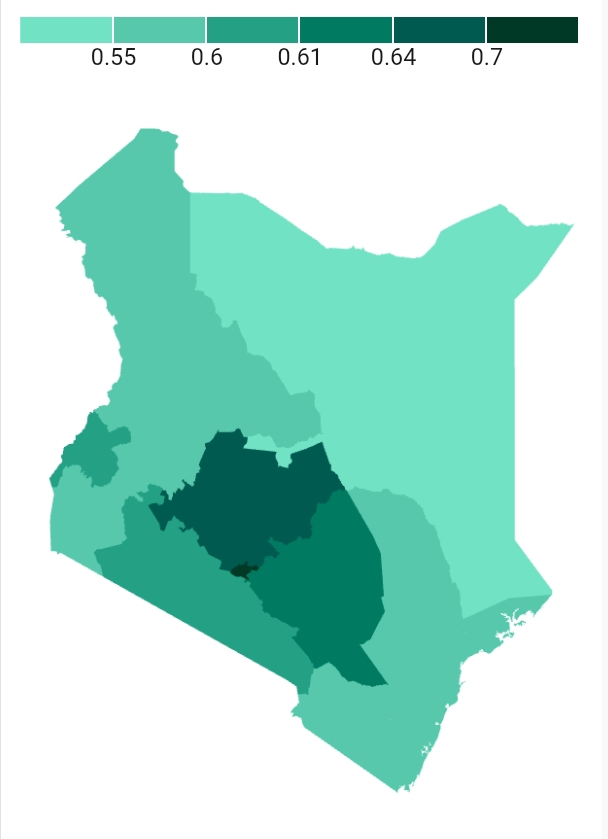
Regions of Kenya by Human Development Index

Rank	∆	Region	HDI (2023)
1	Steady	Nairobi	0.771
2	Steady	Mount Kenya	0.643
3	▲ (3)	Lower Eastern	0.610
4	▲ (3)	South Rift	0.605
5	▼ (2)	Western	0.605
6	▼ (2)	Coast	0.599
7	▲ (1)	Nyanza	0.595
8	▼ (3)	North Rift	0.583
9	Steady	Northern	0.509

== Provinces ==
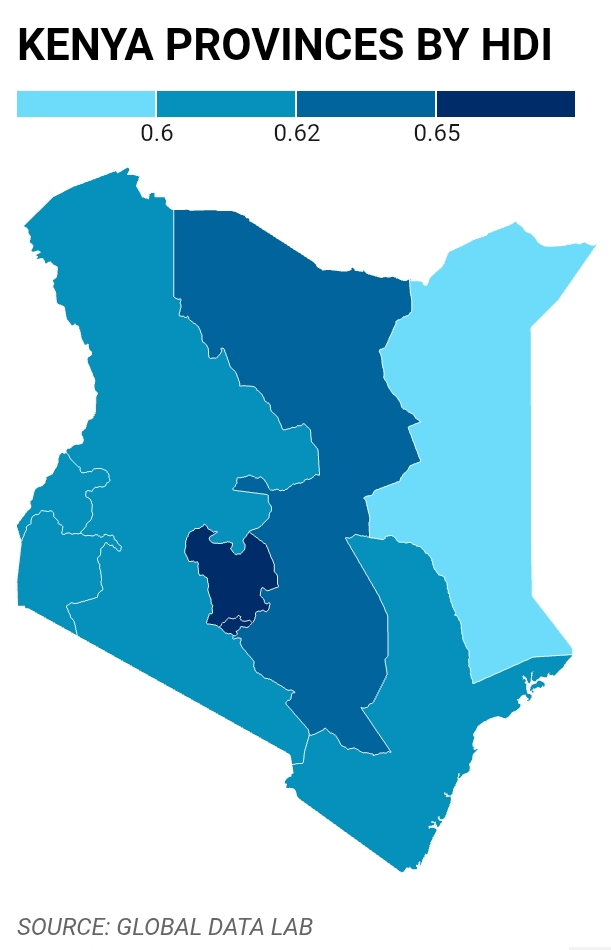
Kenyan Provinces by Human Development Index 2023

Rank	Province	HDI (2023)
Medium human development
1	Nairobi Province	0.694
2	Central Province	0.656
–	Kenya	0.628
3	Eastern Province	0.620
4	Rift Valley Province	0.619
5	Western Province	0.610
6	Coast Province	0.607
7	Nyanza Province	0.604
Low human development
8	North Eastern Province	0.487

== See also ==
- List of counties of Kenya by GDP
- List of Kenyan counties by Christian population
- List of East African Community sub regions by Human Development Index
