= Phyllis Omido =

Kenyan environmentalist

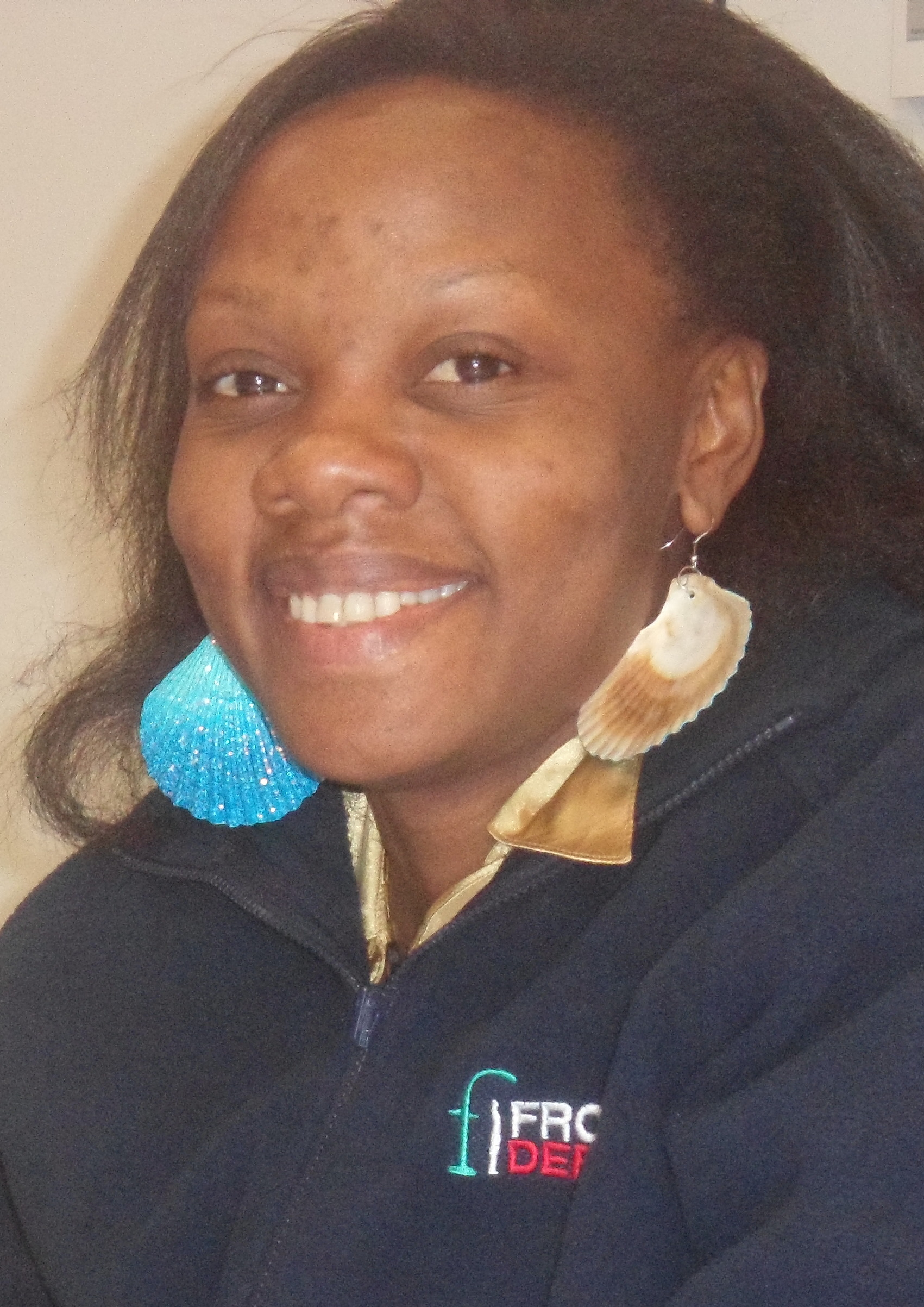
- Phyllis Omido in 2014
- Born: Phyllis Indiatsi Omido; 1978 (age 47–48); Kidinye Village, Vihiga County, Western Province, Kenya
- Education: University of Nairobi
- Occupation: Activist
- Organization(s): Centre for Justice, Governance and Environmental Action (CJGEA)
- Known for: Organizing protests against a lead smelting plant
- Children: Kingdavid Jeremiah Indiatsi
- Awards: 2015 Goldman Environmental Prize

Phyllis Indiatsi Omido (born 1978) is a Kenyan environmental activist. Dubbed the "East African Erin Brockovich", she was one of the recipients of the 2015 Goldman Environmental Prize. She is known for organizing protests against a lead smelting plant in Owino Uhuru, which caused lead poisoning in the environment, and the plant was eventually closed. She is the founder of the Centre for Justice, Governance and Environmental Action (CJGEA).

== Biography ==
Phyllis Omido was born in Kidinye in the Vihiga County of Kenya, to Margaret and Alfred Omido. She has two brothers–George Mukutu and Silas Enane,–and a sister, Susan Monyani Kasuki. She has two children named Kingdavid Jeremiah Indiatsi and Margaret Esma Ehwa. She studied Business Administration at the University of Nairobi and worked in industries in Kenya for more than 15 years.

== Activism ==
=== Organization against the smelting plant ===
The plant started operations in 2009 in Owino Uhuru. It salvaged the lead from old car batteries. The result of the process was lead fumes which were released into the environment. Also, acid wastewater was not treated and was released into streams used by residents to bathe.

While working there as a community liaison officer, Omido commissioned an environmental impact assessment (EIA). The findings showed that the plant was releasing lead into the environment. As community relations officer, she made a recommendation that the smelter close and reopen elsewhere. Her superiors disagreed and reassigned her, bringing in a different consultant to finish the EIA.

Shortly after she started working at the smelter, Omido's baby became ill. She rushed him to hospital. They initially thought it was typhoid or malaria, but it was determined to be lead poisoning. She concluded that it must have been from the smelter. She selected three, random children and gave them blood tests. Each had levels of lead that were above the safe level according to the standards set by the US Centers for Disease Control and Prevention. She then quit her job and began her campaign to close the plant.

In 2012, Omido, along with her son, was accosted by armed men outside her home but managed to escape.

After getting no results from company leaders and government officials to close the plant, she organized a demonstration. She was arrested along with 16 other members of CJGEA while lobbying against toxic waste. The CJGEA offices were raided and police confiscated documents and computers. After spending a night in jail, she was charged with "inciting violence" and illegal gathering. After a lengthy court battle, a judge dismissed the case under section 210. The magistrate stated that she had acted within the law.

She then started to get help from Human Rights Watch and other groups. She met with the United Nations Special Rapporteur on toxic waste. This prompted the Kenyan Senate to come to the plant to assess the claims. The plant was finally closed in January 2014.

=== Centre for Justice, Governance and Environmental Action ===
In 2009, Omido founded The Centre for Justice, Governance and Environmental Action (CJGEA). Registered in Kilifi County and based in Mombasa, the organization was established to address environmental issues faced by the settlements near Kenya's industrial areas. In doing so, CJGEA has also become involved in addressing other issues, such as governance, policy change, and human rights. Programmes that the organization provides are climate change and environmental governance, activism and human rights, legal aid, and education.

CJGEA partnered with Human Rights Watch in the creation of a film on the poisoning of communities with toxic materials. It will focus on the death and health issues, as well as impunity and disregard for the environment and rule of law committed by the offenders. The film was launched on June 24, 2014 to coincide with the first UN Assembly on environment held in Nairobi.

=== Recent work ===
In February 2013, representing CJGEA, Omido attended a United Nations Environment Programme consultation forum on human rights and the environment, sponsored by the United Nations Environment Program.

In 2013 Omido represented Kenya's HRDs at Risk in Dublin, Ireland.

In 2014 she went to Geneva, Switzerland to attend the Universal Rights Group Consultative Forum for Environmental Human Rights Defenders.

From September 5 to 7, 2014, she attended the 3rd United Nations Institute for Training and Research-Yale Conference on Environmental Governance and Democracy at Yale University, New Haven, Connecticut.

On September 23, 2014, she was present at KIOS, the Finnish international human rights seminar.

She continues lobbying government. In 2014, three toxic waste smelters in poor, urban settlements were relocated to other parts of Mombasa.

== Awards ==
Omido was one of six recipients of the 2015 Goldman Environmental Prize. The award is the largest in the world for grassroots activists whose cause is the environment. She received a trophy along with prize money of US$175,000 or 5.7 million Kenya Shillings.

Omido was on the list of the BBC's 100 Women announced on 23 November 2020.

In 2021, she was included in the Time 100, Time's annual list of the 100 most influential people in the world.

Other accolades she has garnered during her activism years are:

Year	Award
2018	Mombasa County Environment Champion
2018	Italian Bar Association Woman of courage and Honorary member of the Bar
2020	Ethecon Blue Planet Award.
