= List of counties of Kenya by Gross County Product =

Gross County Product

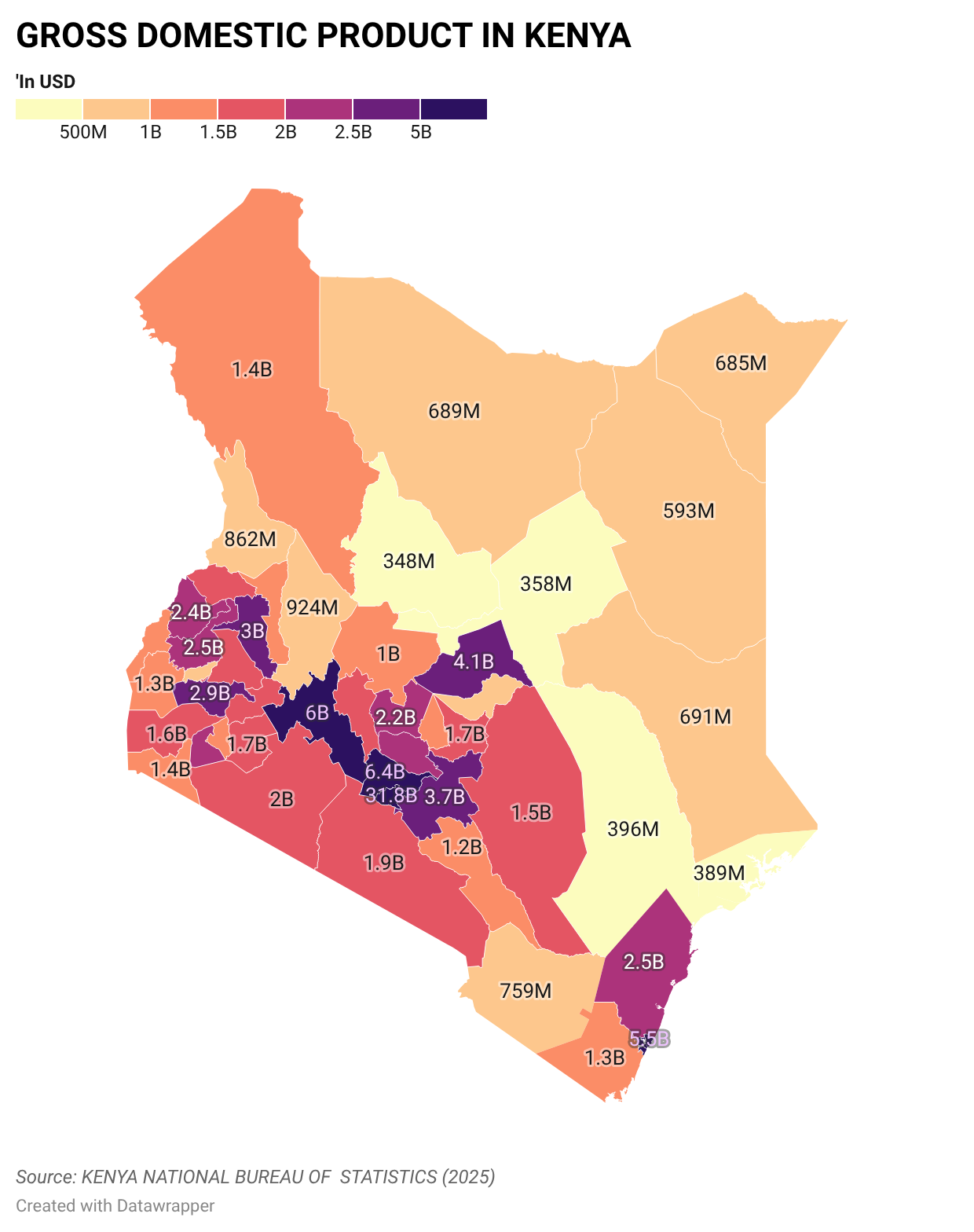
Kenyan Counties by GDP 2025

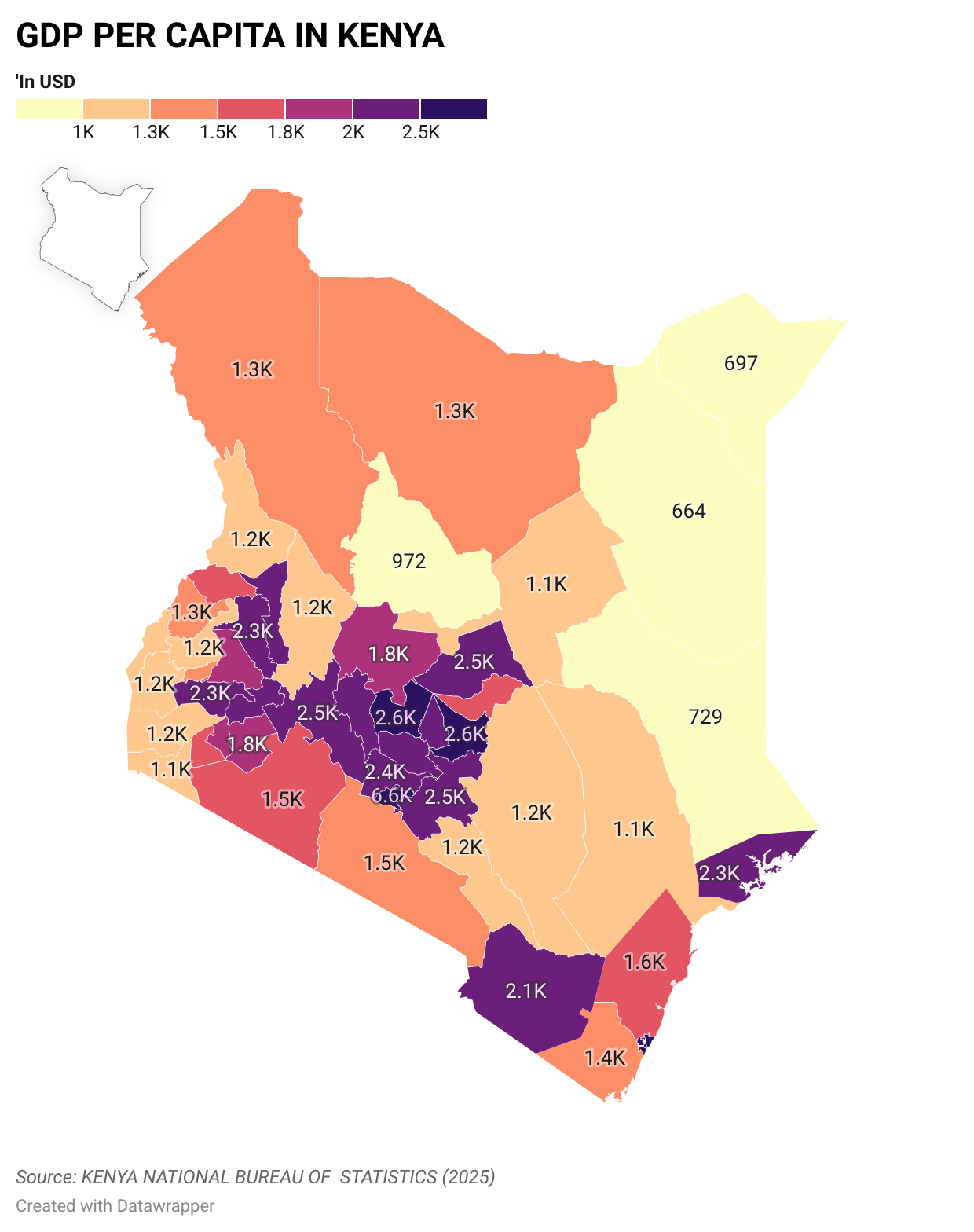
GDP PER CAPITA IN KENYA 2024

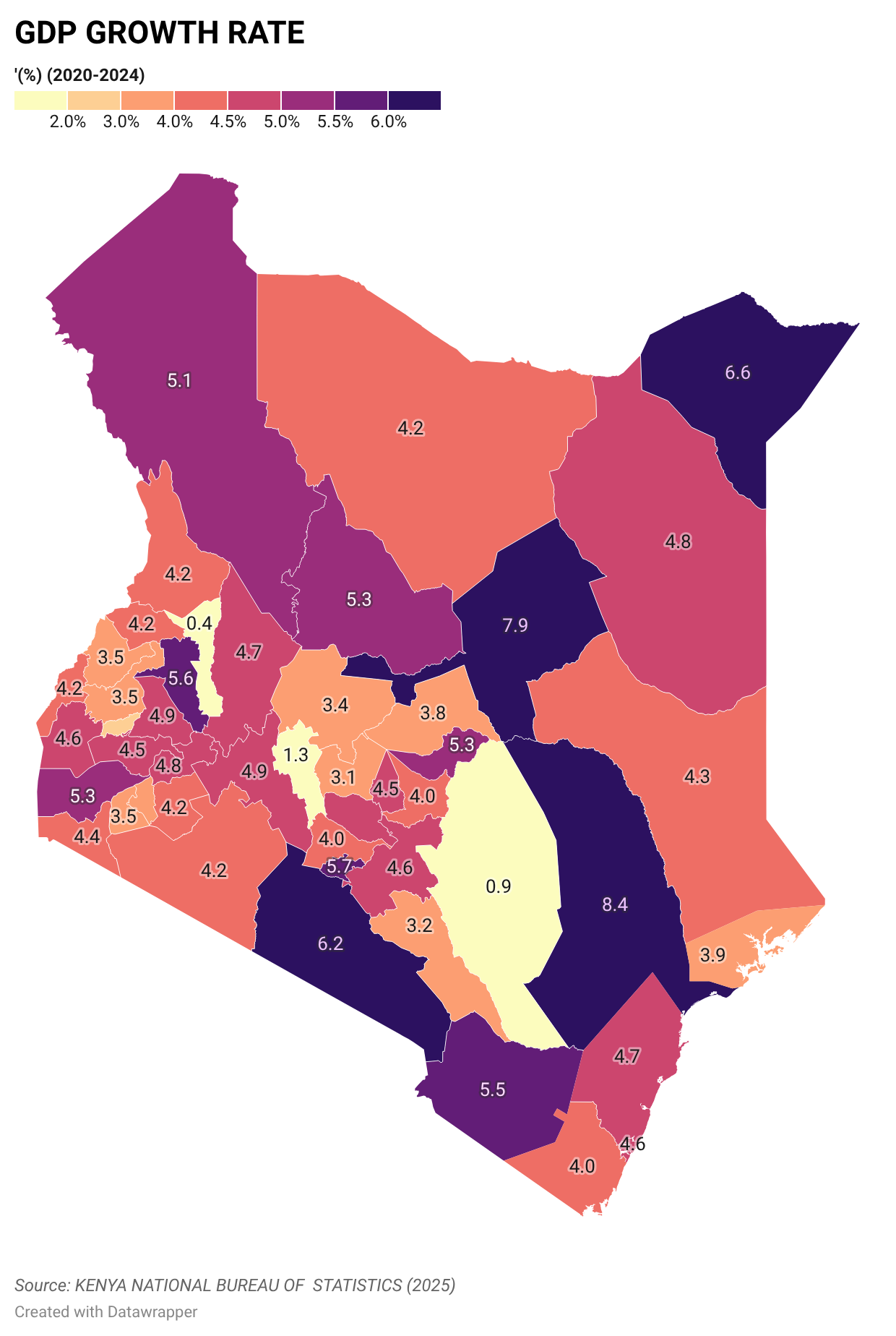
KENYA GCP GROWTH RATE BY COUNTY 2025

This is a List of Kenyan Counties by Gross County Product 2025 for the year 2024. As of 2024 , Nairobi is the main contributor to the economy with a GDP of Ksh. 4.106 trillion ($31.8 B) . Kiambu Ksh. 819.8 billion ($6.36 B) , Nakuru Ksh 771.8 billion ($5.98 B) , Mombasa Ksh 711.1 billion ($5.51 B) and Meru Ksh 525.8 billion ($4.08 B) are also among the largest economies in Kenya. On the lower end Elgeyo Marakwet Ksh. 150.3 billion ($1.17 B) , Samburu Ksh. 44.8 billion ($0.35 B) and Isiolo Ksh. 46.2 billion ($0.36 B) have the lowest gdp. In terms of GDP Per Capita Nairobi stands out with a GDP Per Capita of Ksh. 850,332 ($6,591). Mombasa follows closely with Ksh. 530,747 ($4,114) . Nyeri Ksh. 339,903 ($2,635) , Embu Ksh. 334,159 ($2,590) , Nakuru County Ksh. 322,040 ($2,497) also are among the wealthiest counties in Kenya. Wajir Ksh. 85,600 ($664) and Mandera Ksh. 89,903 ($697) are the poorest in Kenya in terms of GDP Per Capita. GDP Per Capita is highly Concentrated in Mount Kenya region , Nairobi Metropolitan area and Central Rift valley and lowest in North Eastern Kenya. In terms of GDP growth rate, Tana River (8.4%) , Isiolo (7.9%) and Mandera (6.6%) have the highest GCP growth rate. On the other hand, Elgeyo Marakwet (0.4%) , Kitui (0.4%) have the lowest economic growth rate.

== GDP ==
GDP BY ECONOMIC BLOC

Kenyan counties by nominal GDP and GDP (PPP) (2024, USD billions)
#	County	GDP (KSh)	GDP (USD)	GDP (PPP)
1	Nairobi	4.106 T	$31.8 B	$95.0 B
2	Kiambu	819.8 B	$6.36 B	$19.0 B
3	Nakuru	771.8 B	$5.98 B	$17.9 B
4	Mombasa	711.1 B	$5.51 B	$16.4 B
5	Meru	525.8 B	$4.08 B	$12.2 B
6	Machakos	476.4 B	$3.69 B	$11.0 B
7	Uasin Gishu	382.7 B	$2.97 B	$8.87 B
8	Kisumu	370.9 B	$2.88 B	$8.60 B
9	Kilifi	321.4 B	$2.49 B	$7.43 B
10	Kakamega	316.4 B	$2.45 B	$7.31 B
11	Bungoma	305.3 B	$2.37 B	$7.07 B
12	Murang'a	295.9 B	$2.29 B	$6.84 B
13	Kisii	287.5 B	$2.23 B	$6.66 B
14	Nyeri	286.9 B	$2.22 B	$6.63 B
15	Narok	256.0 B	$1.98 B	$5.91 B
16	Kericho	251.3 B	$1.95 B	$5.82 B
17	Trans Nzoia	247.9 B	$1.92 B	$5.73 B
18	Kajiado	243.4 B	$1.89 B	$5.64 B
19	Nandi	235.5 B	$1.83 B	$5.46 B
20	Bomet	221.4 B	$1.72 B	$5.13 B
21	Embu	218.9 B	$1.70 B	$5.08 B
22	Nyandarua	218.2 B	$1.69 B	$5.05 B
23	Homa Bay	200.6 B	$1.56 B	$4.66 B
24	Kitui	196.3 B	$1.52 B	$4.54 B
25	Kirinyaga	186.0 B	$1.44 B	$4.30 B
26	Migori	183.3 B	$1.42 B	$4.24 B
27	Turkana	178.4 B	$1.38 B	$4.12 B
28	Kwale	169.4 B	$1.31 B	$3.91 B
29	Nyamira	169.2 B	$1.31 B	$3.91 B
30	Siaya	163.9 B	$1.27 B	$3.79 B
31	Makueni	159.2 B	$1.23 B	$3.67 B
32	Elgeyo/Marakwet	150.3 B	$1.17 B	$3.49 B
33	Laikipia	134.9 B	$1.05 B	$3.13 B
34	Busia	132.2 B	$1.03 B	$3.07 B
35	Baringo	119.1 B	$0.92 B	$2.75 B
36	Vihiga	116.1 B	$0.90 B	$2.69 B
37	West Pokot	111.1 B	$0.86 B	$2.57 B
38	Taita/Taveta	97.9 B	$0.76 B	$2.27 B
39	Tharaka-Nithi	95.1 B	$0.74 B	$2.21 B
40	Garissa	89.2 B	$0.69 B	$2.06 B
41	Marsabit	88.8 B	$0.69 B	$2.06 B
42	Mandera	88.4 B	$0.69 B	$2.06 B
43	Wajir	76.4 B	$0.59 B	$1.76 B
44	Tana River	51.1 B	$0.40 B	$1.19 B
45	Lamu	50.2 B	$0.39 B	$1.16 B
46	Isiolo	46.2 B	$0.36 B	$1.07 B
47	Samburu	44.8 B	$0.35 B	$1.04 B

== GDP Per Capita ==
Kenyan counties by GDP per capita (2024, KSh and USD) - Average Production Per Person
Rank	County	GDP per capita (KSh)	GDP per capita (USD)	GDP PPP per capita (USD)*
1	Nairobi	850,332	$6,591	$19,673
2	Mombasa	530,747	$4,114	$12,274
3	Nyeri	339,903	$2,635	$7,862
4	Embu	334,159	$2,590	$7,729
5	Nakuru	322,040	$2,497	$7,449
6	Meru	319,393	$2,476	$7,389
7	Machakos	316,919	$2,457	$7,331
8	Nyandarua	308,006	$2,388	$7,125
9	Kiambu	303,248	$2,351	$7,016
10	Elgeyo/Marakwet	299,331	$2,320	$6,922
11	Uasin Gishu	298,525	$2,315	$6,907
12	Lamu	292,807	$2,270	$6,773
13	Kisumu	292,183	$2,265	$6,758
14	Kirinyaga	282,454	$2,190	$6,534
15	Taita/Taveta	265,649	$2,060	$6,146
16	Murang'a	263,200	$2,041	$6,090
17	Kericho	259,725	$2,014	$6,009
18	Nyamira	255,713	$1,982	$5,914
19	Nandi	243,602	$1,888	$5,634
20	Laikipia	235,801	$1,828	$5,454
21	Bomet	232,471	$1,802	$5,377
22	Trans Nzoia	227,725	$1,766	$5,270
23	Tharaka-Nithi	225,923	$1,751	$5,225
24	Kisii	211,742	$1,641	$4,896
25	Kilifi	199,980	$1,550	$4,625
26	Narok	193,953	$1,504	$4,488
27	Kajiado	187,486	$1,454	$4,339
28	Vihiga	184,000	$1,426	$4,255
29	Kwale	175,289	$1,359	$4,055
30	Turkana	170,234	$1,320	$3,938
31	Marsabit	168,529	$1,307	$3,900
32	Bungoma	168,139	$1,303	$3,888
33	West Pokot	160,739	$1,246	$3,718
34	Homa Bay	159,822	$1,239	$3,697
35	Baringo	159,074	$1,233	$3,680
36	Kitui	157,776	$1,223	$3,649
37	Kakamega	155,285	$1,204	$3,593
38	Siaya	151,968	$1,178	$3,516
39	Makueni	151,078	$1,171	$3,494
40	Migori	145,156	$1,125	$3,357
41	Isiolo	142,993	$1,109	$3,309
42	Tana River	141,503	$1,097	$3,273
43	Busia	133,924	$1,038	$3,097
44	Samburu	125,400	$972	$2,900
45	Garissa	93,965	$729	$2,175
46	Mandera	89,903	$697	$2,079
47	Wajir	85,600	$664	$1,981

== Growth ==
Kenyan counties by average GDP growth rate (2020-2024)
Rank	County	Avg. Growth Rate (2020-2024)
1	Tana River	8.4%
2	Isiolo	7.9%
3	Mandera	6.6%
4	Kajiado	6.2%
5	Nairobi City	5.7%
6	Uasin Gishu	5.6%
7	Taita Taveta	5.5%
8	Homa Bay	5.3%
9	Tharaka-Nithi	5.3%
10	Samburu	5.3%
11	Turkana	5.1%
12	Nakuru	4.9%
13	Nandi	4.9%
14	Kericho	4.8%
15	Murang'a	4.8%
16	Wajir	4.8%
17	Kilifi	4.7%
18	Baringo	4.7%
19	Siaya	4.6%
20	Machakos	4.6%
21	Mombasa	4.6%
22	Kisumu	4.5%
23	Kirinyaga	4.5%
24	Migori	4.4%
25	Garissa	4.3%
26	Trans Nzoia	4.2%
27	Narok	4.2%
28	Busia	4.2%
29	Marsabit	4.2%
30	West Pokot	4.2%
31	Bomet	4.2%
32	Kwale	4.0%
33	Kiambu	4.0%
34	Embu	4.0%
35	Lamu	3.9%
36	Meru	3.8%
37	Kakamega	3.5%
38	Kisii	3.5%
39	Bungoma	3.5%
40	Laikipia	3.4%
41	Nyamira	3.2%
42	Makueni	3.2%
43	Nyeri	3.1%
44	Vihiga	2.1%
45	Nyandarua	1.3%
46	Kitui	0.9%
47	Elgeyo-Marakwet	0.4%

== History (2020 - 2024) ==
=== GDP ===
Gross County Product by county (2020–2024, KSh millions)
#	County	2020	2021	2022	2023	2024
1	Nairobi City	2,685,707	3,001,449	3,453,792	3,834,171	4,105,576
2	Kiambu	555,593	618,360	695,551	760,998	819,834
3	Nakuru	479,851	565,879	633,411	755,946	771,775
4	Mombasa	469,299	528,840	605,258	670,023	711,088
5	Meru	330,174	377,767	415,003	473,666	525,775
6	Machakos	309,325	353,472	391,357	447,375	476,363
7	Uasin Gishu	228,044	266,546	296,307	344,659	382,738
8	Kisumu	246,965	271,383	309,513	341,154	370,851
9	Kilifi	200,075	233,337	263,157	293,066	321,352
10	Kakamega	214,435	246,157	271,549	286,977	316,393
11	Bungoma	205,568	225,689	252,535	264,244	305,311
12	Murang'a	200,547	225,970	249,118	261,520	295,890
13	Kisii	198,254	220,670	246,432	265,371	287,469
14	Nyeri	209,872	224,205	237,391	263,814	286,882
15	Narok	165,502	185,178	204,506	235,112	255,960
16	Kericho	163,474	182,174	205,105	228,447	251,273
17	Trans Nzoia	165,744	177,618	196,597	228,901	247,909
18	Kajiado	151,101	160,622	190,875	220,303	243,374
19	Nandi	149,170	164,996	189,766	215,199	235,499
20	Bomet	151,199	168,199	199,716	208,913	221,429
21	Embu	148,107	163,399	180,715	194,121	218,893
22	Nyandarua	149,741	162,032	181,580	202,065	218,167
23	Homa Bay	120,773	147,854	168,678	182,858	200,564
24	Kitui	154,360	142,637	162,744	176,954	196,332
25	Kirinyaga	123,782	139,626	155,473	173,594	185,978
26	Migori	120,673	137,891	153,121	162,286	183,338
27	Turkana	107,455	111,946	133,309	155,744	178,441
28	Kwale	119,049	136,830	152,436	164,038	169,375
29	Nyamira	117,033	125,423	144,185	151,092	169,151
30	Siaya	103,951	119,870	134,574	142,092	163,867
31	Makueni	110,231	123,371	135,913	148,630	159,220
32	Elgeyo-Marakwet	117,246	130,358	121,746	137,127	150,318
33	Laikipia	94,686	100,425	115,507	127,981	134,909
34	Busia	88,756	99,739	114,489	123,176	132,204
35	Baringo	75,473	85,219	91,307	106,909	119,126
36	Vihiga	83,809	90,314	101,042	110,396	116,112
37	West Pokot	79,081	83,148	87,113	105,971	111,134
38	Taita/Taveta	63,620	73,307	79,722	88,610	97,878
39	Tharaka-Nithi	61,474	71,047	80,473	89,248	95,071
40	Garissa	59,342	66,047	67,519	73,828	89,170
41	Marsabit	59,514	67,869	73,359	85,638	88,848
42	Mandera	57,012	62,876	63,659	74,043	88,395
43	Wajir	49,166	59,135	65,165	69,626	76,431
44	Tana River	29,469	35,516	37,693	43,484	51,145
45	Lamu	32,759	36,525	42,345	49,580	50,222
46	Isiolo	26,588	29,509	32,530	36,845	46,218
47	Samburu	29,098	31,030	34,351	39,360	44,847
	Total	9,862,147	11,031,456	12,417,686	13,815,154	14,968,094

=== GDP per capita (2020 - 2024) ===
Gross County Product per capita by county (2020–2024, KSh)
Rank	County	2020	2021	2022	2023	2024
1	Nairobi City	594,761	653,376	739,268	807,184	850,332
2	Mombasa	382,140	421,049	471,410	510,743	530,747
3	Nyeri	259,230	274,021	287,118	315,791	339,903
4	Embu	235,641	257,257	281,579	299,374	334,159
5	Nakuru	217,933	251,446	275,495	321,974	322,040
6	Meru	210,917	238,248	258,441	291,311	319,393
7	Machakos	214,553	242,591	265,793	300,704	316,919
8	Nyandarua	227,861	241,857	265,957	290,520	308,006
9	Kiambu	222,149	242,340	267,288	286,857	303,248
10	Elgeyo-Marakwet	247,136	270,812	249,326	276,891	299,331
11	Uasin Gishu	192,763	220,688	240,399	274,120	298,525
12	Lamu	211,659	229,772	259,553	296,294	292,807
13	Kisumu	208,206	224,854	252,108	273,256	292,183
14	Kirinyaga	194,278	217,329	240,007	265,796	282,454
15	Taita/Taveta	181,453	206,458	221,738	243,442	265,649
16	Murang'a	186,288	207,606	226,394	235,119	263,200
17	Kericho	178,228	195,933	217,656	239,238	259,725
18	Nyamira	181,295	193,099	220,630	229,797	255,713
19	Nandi	164,714	179,167	202,702	226,177	243,602
20	Laikipia	179,157	186,174	209,891	228,039	235,801
21	Bomet	167,712	183,969	215,438	222,305	232,471
22	Trans Nzoia	164,059	172,469	187,334	214,118	227,725
23	Tharaka-Nithi	152,502	174,335	195,343	214,340	225,923
24	Kisii	151,720	167,245	184,985	197,316	211,742
25	Kilifi	134,407	153,697	170,026	185,798	199,980
26	Narok	140,528	152,635	163,774	183,080	193,953
27	Kajiado	128,186	132,900	154,127	173,705	187,486
28	Vihiga	137,408	146,803	162,844	176,418	184,000
29	Kwale	135,425	151,886	165,212	173,683	175,289
30	Turkana	113,533	115,183	133,665	152,276	170,234
31	Marsabit	124,097	138,089	145,730	166,193	168,529
32	Bungoma	120,893	130,512	143,640	147,872	168,139
33	West Pokot	125,302	128,675	131,738	156,686	160,739
34	Homa Bay	103,947	124,757	139,588	148,465	159,822
35	Baringo	109,904	121,351	127,205	145,785	159,074
36	Kitui	130,147	118,802	133,922	143,889	157,776
37	Kakamega	113,025	127,390	138,027	143,314	155,285
38	Siaya	103,647	117,316	129,321	134,118	151,968
39	Makueni	109,408	121,057	131,864	142,598	151,078
40	Migori	105,189	117,239	127,059	131,503	145,156
41	Isiolo	90,403	97,913	105,390	116,622	142,993
42	Tana River	90,430	106,091	109,682	123,343	141,503
43	Busia	97,150	107,018	120,467	127,148	133,924
44	Samburu	90,844	94,133	101,339	113,006	125,400
45	Garissa	68,906	74,786	74,600	79,639	93,965
46	Mandera	64,255	68,999	68,066	77,190	89,903
47	Wajir	61,161	71,581	76,810	79,972	85,600

== See also ==
- Gross regional domestic product
- List of East African Community sub regions by Human Development Index
- List of Kenyan counties by Human Development Index
