= Ramadhan Seif Kajembe =

Kenyan politician (1944–2020)

Ramadhan Seif Kajembe (3 June 1944 – 7 August 2020) was a Kenyan politician. He was a member of the Orange Democratic Movement and was elected to represent the Changamwe Constituency in the National Assembly of Kenya from 1997 to 2013.

Kajembe died from suspected COVID-19 complications.
