= Majengo, Mombasa =

Majengo
- Location in Kenya
- Coordinates: 4°2′55″S 39°40′14″E
- Country: Kenya
- County: Mombasa County

Population (2011)
  - Total: 38,800 (est.)
- Time zone: UTC+3 (EAT)

Majengo is a ward of Mombasa city, Kenya, located on Mombasa Island. It is estimated to have a population of 38,800 in 2011.

It is divided between in the Kisauni and Mvita electoral constituencies.
