= List of Kenyan counties by Christian population =

Kisii, Kirinyaga, and Nyamira counties recorded the highest proportions of Christians in Kenya, each with over 98% of their populations identifying as Christian. In contrast, Mandera and Wajir had the lowest proportions, with less than 1%. In terms of absolute numbers, Nairobi, Kiambu, and Nakuru had the largest Christian populations, each exceeding two million Christians, while Wajir and Mandera reported fewer than 10,000 Christians. The North Eastern region had the fewest Christians overall, largely due to the predominance of Islam, followed by the Coastal region. Conversely, Central Kenya, the Western region, and parts of Lower Eastern had the highest concentrations of Christians both proportionally and numerically.

== List ==
#	County	Christian population	
#	County	Number	Percentage
-	Kenya	40,374,087	85.50%
1	Kisii	1,238,856	98.28%
2	Nyamira	592,383	98.23%
3	Kirinyaga	592,157	97.78%
4	Nyeri	735,731	97.75%
5	Elgeyo/Marakwet	443,173	97.74%
6	Machakos	1,381,248	97.68%
7	Makueni	954,304	97.68%
8	Murang'a	1,028,150	97.64%
9	Tharaka-Nithi	381,094	97.39%
10	Embu	588,959	97.39%
11	Vihiga	571,776	97.37%
12	Homa Bay	1,094,544	97.22%
13	Nandi	858,779	97.19%
14	Migori	1,075,897	97.02%
15	Bungoma	1,609,154	96.71%
16	Kiambu	2,322,520	96.66%
17	Trans Nzoia	952,167	96.63%
18	Siaya	955,250	96.52%
19	Meru	1,478,273	96.26%
20	Busia	852,452	96.12%
21	Nyandarua	610,195	95.94%
22	Uasin Gishu	1,105,778	95.93%
23	Kisumu	1,098,063	95.92%
24	Bomet	833,942	95.52%
25	Kitui	1,078,429	95.42%
26	Kericho	854,268	95.25%
27	Kajiado	1,045,017	94.38%
28	Nakuru	2,007,377	93.69%
29	Kakamega	1,741,705	93.57%
30	Laikipia	473,890	92.22%
31	Narok	1,056,447	91.88%
32	West Pokot	567,431	91.69%
33	Taita-Taveta	305,619	91.03%
34	Baringo	595,921	89.92%
35	Nairobi	3,853,527	88.85%
36	Turkana	802,053	86.97%
37	Samburu	260,534	84.60%
38	Kilifi	977,522	67.84%
39	Mombasa	713,056	59.87%
40	Lamu	66,660	46.97%
41	Kwale	312,058	36.34%
42	Marsabit	156,426	34.98%
43	Isiolo	64,457	24.05%
44	Tana River	56,302	17.89%
45	Garissa	18,555	2.22%
46	Wajir	7,168	0.92%
47	Mandera	4,820	0.56%
