= Yvonne Okwara =

Kenyan journalist

- Born: Yvonne Buliba Okwara Matole; March 16, 1983 (age 43); Nairobi, Kenya
- Citizenship: Kenya
- Education: Kianda High School
- Alma mater: Jomo Kenyatta University of Agriculture and Technology
- Occupations: Journalist, news anchor, media consultant
- Years active: 2000s–present
- Employer: Citizen TV (Royal Media Services)
- Known for: Television journalism and political interviews
- Spouse: Andrew Matole (m. 2014)

Yvonne Okwara Buliba Matole is a Kenyan television journalist working for Citizen TV. She has over 15 years of experience in radio and television.

== Biography ==
Okwara was born on March 16, 1983, in Nairobi, Kenya. She is an alumnus of Kianda High School. She holds a BSc in microbiology from the Jomo Kenyatta University of Agriculture and Technology. She is a graduate of the Bloomberg/ Africa Leadership Initiative Media fellowship.

Okwara's first job in media was at KBC where she was doing a children's show. She was hired by radio station, Hot 96FM, then joined the Nation group through QFM, QTV, and was later hired by Kenya Television Network (KTN).

== Personal life ==
She is married to Andrew Matole, who is a veterinary surgeon.
