= Changamwe =

- Location within Kenya
- Coordinates: 4°1′34″S 39°37′50″E
- Country: Kenya
- County: Mombasa County
- Time zone: UTC-3 (EAT)

Changamwe is a suburb of Mombasa, in Mombasa County, in the former Coast Province of Kenya.

== Geography ==
The area is primarily industrial, with a number of modern concrete tower blocks housing residents. Industries include refineries and various process industries. There is a franchise of Barclays Bank located on the major Mombasa-Nairobi road.

== Transport ==
The district is located on the Kenyan mainland, and Mombasa Island is accessible by road, rail and on foot via the Makupa Causeway.

Preceding station	Uganda Railway	Following station
Mombasa	Changamwe; Main line	Miritini

== Electoral constituencies ==
- Changamwe Constituency
