= Nyali Constituency =

Electoral constituency in Kenya

Nyali
- constituency for the Parliament of Kenya

- County: Mombasa County
- Population: 216,577
- Area: 22.88 km^{2} (8.8 sq mi)

Current constituency
- Party: UDA
- Member of Parliament: Mohamed Mohamed Ali
- Created from: Kisauni Constituency

Nyali is a constituency in Kenya. It is one of six constituencies in Mombasa County. It was created from Kisauni Constituency after the promulgation of the New Constitution of Kenya in 2010. It was established for the 2013 General Elections. The current MP is a former journalist, Mohammed Ali alias Jicho Pevu who initially won the elections on an Independent Ticket and returned under the UDA in 2022.

== Members of Parliament ==
Election	Member of Parliament	Party	Remarks
Nyali Constituency created from Kisauni
2013	Hezron Awiti Bollo	WDM-K	
2017	Mohammad Ali	Independent	
2022	Mohammad Ali	UDA	
