= Kenya Bureau of Standards =

The Kenya Bureau of Standards (KEBS) is a government agency responsible for governing and maintaining the standards and practices of metrology in Kenya. It was established by an Act of Parliament of Kenya's National Assembly, The Standard Act, and Chapter 496 of the Laws of Kenya. The Bureau started its operations in July 1974. It has main offices in Nairobi and regional offices throughout Kenya.

The KEBS Board of Directors is known as the National Standards Council ("NSC") and is the policy-making body for supervising and controlling the administration and financial management of the Bureau. Its chief executive is the Managing Director, a position currently held by Ms. Esther Ngari. Ms. Ngari replaced Benard Njiraini whom, among 26 others, was suspended from the Bureau over an alleged release and sale of condemned sugar.

The aims and objectives of KEBS include preparation of standards relating to products, measurements, materials, processes, etc. and their promotion at national, regional and international levels; certification of industrial products; assistance in the production of quality goods; quality inspection of imports at ports of entry; improvement of measurement accuracies and dissemination of information relating to standards.

To keep close liaison with and render efficient services to industry, trade and commerce in different parts of the country, KEBS has six Regional Offices in Mombasa, Kisumu, Nakuru, Garissa, Nyeri, and Eldoret, and has import inspection offices at all the legal points of entry in Kenya.

KEBS is a member of the International Organization for Standardization (ISO). The main functions of KEBS are as follows:

1. Promote standardization in industry and commerce
2. Provide facilities for examination and testing commodities manufactured in Kenya
3. Test goods destined for exports for purposes of certification
4. Prepare, frame or amend specification and codes of practice

== See also ==
- Bureau of Standards
- Metric system
- Metrology
