= Jomvu Constituency =

Constituency in Mombasa County, Kenya

Jomvu
- constituency for the Parliament of Kenya
- Jomvu Constituency within Mombasa County

- Mombasa County within Kenya
- County: Mombasa
- Population: 163,415
- Area: 37 km^{2} (14.3 sq mi)

Current constituency
- Number of members: 1
- Party: ODM
- Member of Parliament: Bady Twalib
- Wards: 3

Jomvu is a constituency in Kenya. It is one of six constituencies in Mombasa County. It was curved out of Changamwe Constituency after the promulgation of the New Constitution in 2010. It had a population of 163,415 people in the 2019 census.

== Members of Parliament ==
Election	MP	Party	Remarks
Jomvu Constituency created from Changamwe Constituency
2013	Bady Twalib	WDM	WDM Party now called WPF
2017	Bady Twalib	ODM	
2022	Bady Twalib	ODM	

== Wards ==
There are 3 wards in Jomvu Constituency: Mikindani, Jomvu Kuu, and Miritini. As of 2022, there are 75,085 registered voters.

Ward	Population
Mikindani	32,794
Jomvu Kuu	24,243
Miritini	18,048
Total	75,085
*As of 2022
