= Voluntary counseling and testing =

Voluntary Counselling and Testing (VCT) for HIV usually involves two counseling sessions: one prior to taking the test known as "pre-test counseling" and one following the HIV test when the results are given, often referred to as "post-test counseling". Counseling focuses on the infection (HIV), the disease (AIDS), the test, and positive behavior change. VCT has become popular in many parts of Africa as a way for a person to learn their HIV status. VCT centers and counselors often use rapid HIV tests that require a drop of blood or some cells from the inside of one's cheek; the tests are cheap, require minimal training, and provide accurate results in about 15 minutes.
