= Mvita Constituency =

Electoral constituency in Mombasa County, Kenya

Mvita
- constituency for the Parliament of Kenya
- Mvita Constituency within Mombasa County

- Mombasa County within Kenya
- County: Mombasa
- Population: 154,171
- Area: 14.8 km^{2} (5.7 sq mi)

Current constituency
- Number of members: 1
- Party: ODM
- Member of Parliament: Machele Mohamed Soud
- Wards: 5

Mvita Constituency is an electoral constituency in Kenya. It is one of six constituencies in Mombasa County, located entirely within the Mombasa municipality area. The constituency was established for the 1988 elections.

== Members of Parliament ==
Elections	MP	Party	Notes
1988	Shariff Nassir	KANU	One-party system.
1992	Shariff Nassir	KANU	
1997	Shariff Nassir	KANU	
2002	Najib Balala	NARC	
2007	Najib Balala	ODM	
2013	Abdullswamad Sheriff Nassir	ODM	
2017	Abdullswamad Sheriff Nassir	ODM	
2022	Machele Mohamed Soud	ODM	

== Locations and wards ==
Locations
Location	Population*		
Majengo	40,241		
Railway	9,527		
Tononoka	29,044		
Old Town	55,000	Total	x
1999 census.

Wards
Ward	Registered Voters
Bondeni	9,352
King'orani	7,471
Majengo	18,272
Mwembe Tayari	11,576
Shimanzi	10,134
Tononoka	9,049
Total	65,854
*September 2005.

== See also ==
- Historic Swahili Settlements
- Swahili architecture
