= Kisauni Constituency =

Kenyan electoral constituency

Kisauni
- constituency for the Parliament of Kenya
- Kisauni Constituency within Mombasa County

- Mombasa County within Kenya
- County: Mombasa County
- Population: 291,930
- Area: 88 km^{2} (34.0 sq mi)

Current constituency
- Party: ODM
- Member of Parliament: Rashid Juma Bedzimba
- Wards: 7

Kisauni Constituency is an electoral constituency in Kenya and is located in Mombasa County.

Government structure.

The constituency has seven wards electing ward representatives for the Mombasa County Assembly. With the promulgation of the new constitution in August 2010, Nyali Constituency was carved out from Kisauni Constituency.

== Members of Parliament ==
Elections	MP	Party	Notes
1988	Said Hemed Said	KANU	One-party system
1992	Rashid M. Mzee	Ford-Kenya	
1997	Emmanuel Karisa Maitha	DP	
2002	Emmanuel Karisa Maitha	NARC	Maitha died in 2004
2005	Ananiah Mwasambu Mwaboza	NLP	By-elections
2007	Hassan Ali Joho	ODM	
2013	Rashid Bedzimba	ODM	
2017	Ali Mbogo Menza	WDM-K	
2022	Rashid Bedzimba	ODM	

== Locations and wards ==
Locations
Location	Population*
Bamburi	45,294
Ganjoni	18,791
Kisauni	117,889
Kongowea	86,678
Majengo	40,241
Mombasa Old Town	21,516
Total	x
1999 census.

Wards
Ward	Registered Voters
Bamburi	16,108
Frere Town	12,154
Kizingo	8,661
Kongowea	13,935
Maweni	13,688
Mjambere	9,476
Mji wa Kale / Makadara	15,243
Mwakirunge	4,136
Total	93,401
*September 2005.
