= Mombasa County =

- County
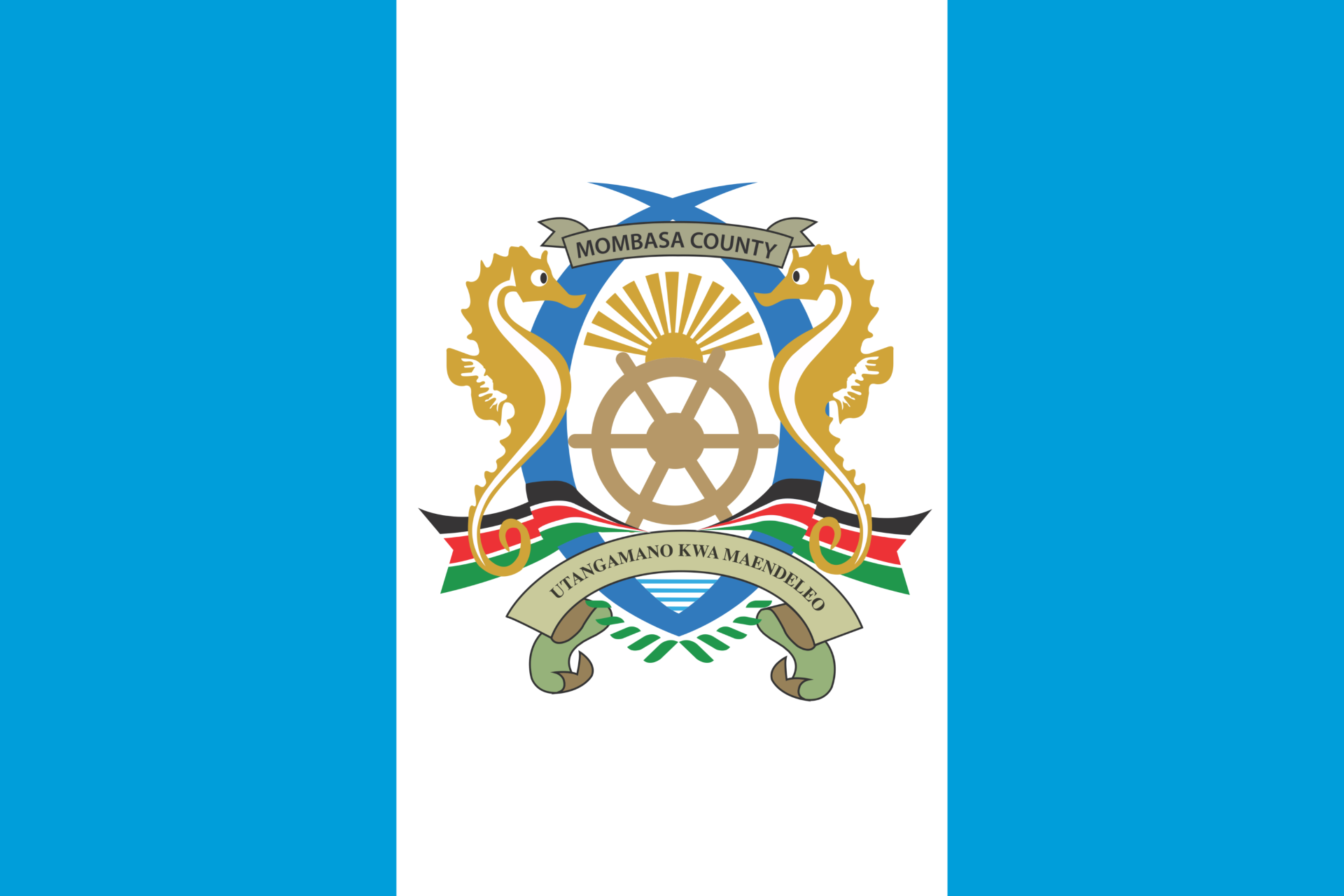
- Flag Coat of arms
- Motto(s): Utangamano kwa Maendeleo (English: Unity for Development)
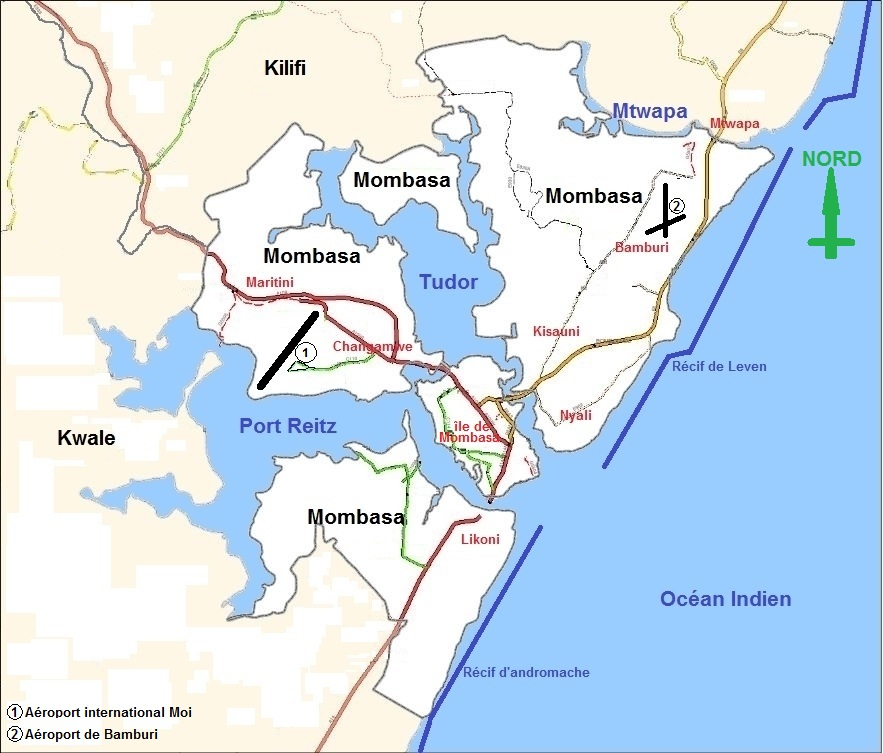
- Map of Mombasa County

- Location of Mombasa County
- Coordinates: 4°03′S 39°40′E
- Country: Kenya
- Formed: 4 March 2013
- Capital: Mombasa

Government
  - Governor: Abdullswamad Sherrif Nassir

Area
  - Total: 294.7 km^{2} (113.8 sq mi)
  - Land: 219.9 km^{2} (84.9 sq mi)
  - Water: 65 km^{2} (25 sq mi)
- Elevation: 50 m (160 ft)

Population (2019)
  - Total: 1,190,987
  - Density: 5,416/km^{2} (14,030/sq mi)

GDP (PPP)
  - Total: ▲$15.374 billion (4th)(2024)
  - Per Capita: ▲$11,974 (2024) (2nd)

GDP (NOMINAL)
  - Total: ▲$5.149 Billion (2024) (4th)
  - Per Capita: ▲$4,018 (2024) (2nd)
- Time zone: UTC+3 (EAT)
- Area code: 020
- ISO 3166 code: KE-28
- HDI (2025): ▲0.698 (2nd): medium
- Website: mombasa.go.ke

Mombasa County is one of the 47 counties of Kenya. Its capital city is Mombasa. In terms of economy, it is second most developed after Nairobi City County. Mombasa was one of the districts of Kenya until 2013 when it was reconstituted as a county on the same boundaries. It is the smallest county in Kenya, covering an area of 229.7 km^{2}, excluding 65 km^{2} of water mass. The county is situated in the southeastern part of the former Coast Province, bordering Kilifi County to the north, Kwale County to the south west and the Indian Ocean to the east. Administratively, the county is divided into seven divisions, eighteen locations and thirty sub-locations.

Prior to 2013, Kenya was divided into eight provinces, which were subdivided into 47 counties. The former Coast Province contained six counties, of which Mombasa was one. It is situated in the southeast of Coast Province, and is the smallest county in size, covering an area of 212.5 km^{2}. The county lies between latitudes 3°56′ and 4°10′ south of the equator and longitudes 39°34′ and 39°46′ east.

== Geographical area ==
The county and the city are divided into four divisions:

- Mombasa Island: 14.1 square kilometres (5.4 sq mi)
- Changamwe: 54.5 square kilometres (21.0 sq mi)
- Likoni: 51.3 square kilometres (19.8 sq mi)
- Kisauni: 109.7 square kilometres (42.4 sq mi)

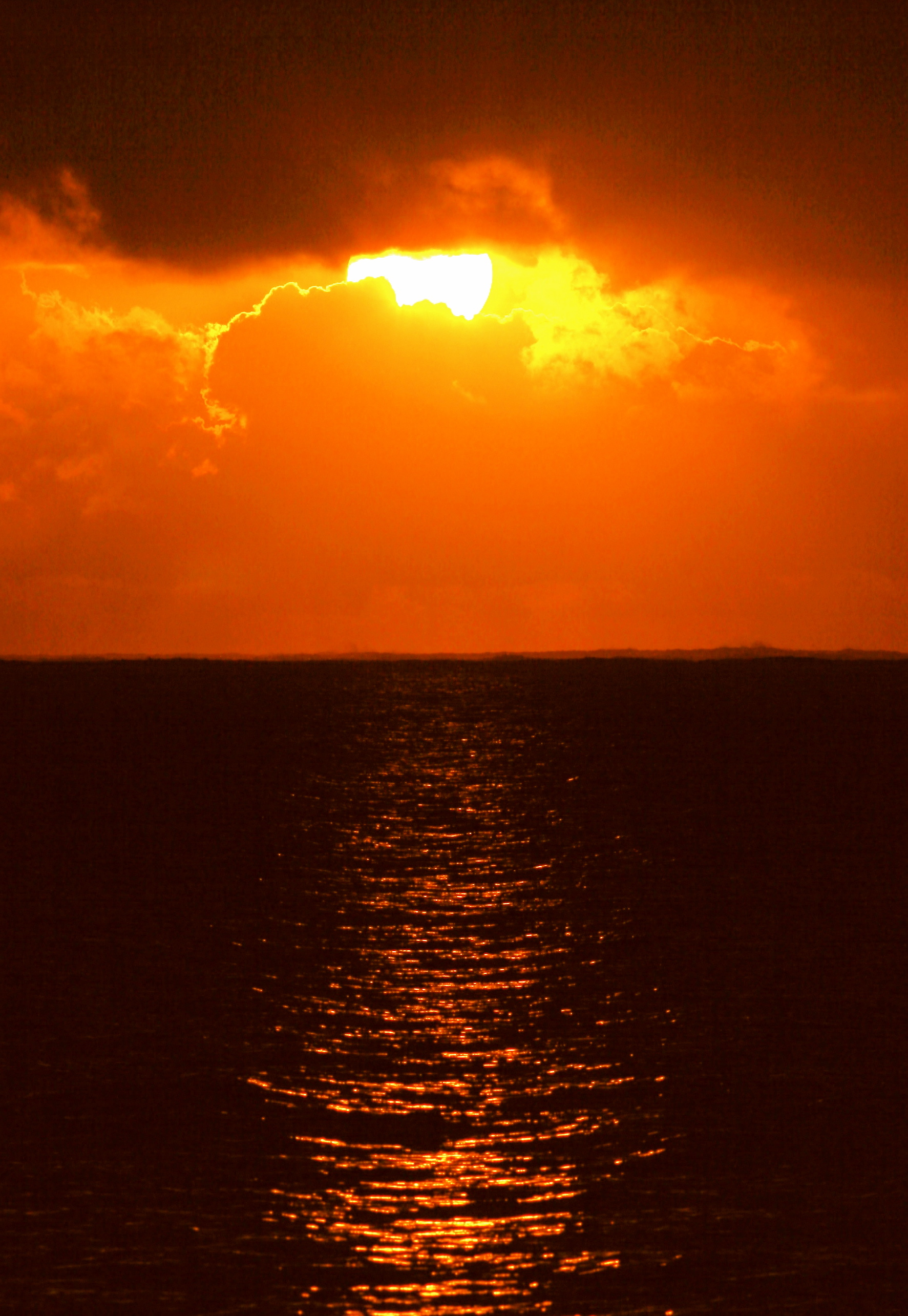
Sunrise in Mombasa

== Demographics ==
Mombasa is an urban city county and for this reason, there is a large population of both local and immigrant communities. The local communities include the Mijikenda, Swahili and Kenyan Arabs. The Mijikenda is the largest community in Mombasa County making up almost 35% of the total population in the county. The immigrant Kamba community is the second largest ethnic community in the county making almost 30% of the total population of the county. The Kamba people have been known for their expansive knowledge of business and trade ranging from small scale to large scale followed closely by their GEMA counterparts. Other significant immigrant communities include the Luo, Luhya and Somali communities.

=== Religion ===
1. Christian (60.0%)
2. Muslim (37.8%)
3. Other Religions (1.20%)
4. No Religion/Not stated (1.60%)
Religion in Mombasa County

== Constituency ==
The county is composed of six Parliamentary constituencies:

Constituency name	Pop. 2009 Census	Area covered	No. of ward	Wards
Changamwe	147,613	16	5	Port Reitz, Kipevu, Airport, Changamwe, Chaani
Jomvu	102,566	29	3	Jomvu Kuu, Miritini, Mikindani
Kisauni	194,065	88.7	7	Mjambere, Junda, Bamburi, Mwakirunge, Mtopanga, Magogoni, Shanzu
Nyali	185,990	22.88	5	Frere Town, Ziwa la Ngombe, Mkomani, Kongowea, Kadzandani
Likoni	166,008	41.10	5	Mtongwe, Shika Adabu, Bofu, Likoni, Timbwani
Mvita	143,128	14.80	5	Mji wa Kale/Makadara, Tudor, Tononoka, Majengo Ganjoni/Shimanzi
Total	939,370	212.48	30	

Mombasa County lies within the coast lowland, which rises gradually from the sea level in the east to slightly over 76 m above sea level in the mainland west. The highest point is at Nguu Tatu hills in the mainland north that rises up to 100 m above sea level.

== Services and urbanisation ==
Stats for Mombasa County
County	Stats for the County (Per cent)
Urbanisation	100
Literacy	85.8
Attending school (15-18 Yrs)	53.6
Paved roads	28.6
Good roads	32
Electricity access	59
Poverty rate	37.6

== See also ==
- Lamu County
