= A12 road (Kenya) =

Road in Kenya

A12 Road

Route information
- Maintained by Kenya National Highways Authority

Major junctions
- North end: Busia
- South end: Mau Summit

Location
- Country: Kenya

Highway system
- Transport in Kenya

The A12 road is a road in Kenya spanning a distance of 228 kilometers. It traverses the western region of the country, forming a crucial east–west route. The A12 originates at the Ugandan border in Busia and extends westward, passing through the city of Kisumu before terminating at Mau Summit. This transportation artery connects key urban centers and facilitates movement across the region, playing a role in Kenya's infrastructure network.

== Route ==
The A12 trunk road commences at the border crossing with Uganda in Busia, marking the beginning of its eastward trajectory. As it traverses the hills and densely populated areas northeast of Lake Victoria, the A12 maintains a continuous paved surface. The road passes through the city of Kisumu, where it shares a dual designation with the A1 and features a semi-grade-separated bypass. At Ahero, the A1 diverges, and the A12 enters the elevated highlands, ascending to notable altitudes: 2,000 meters in Kericho and over 2,500 meters at Mau Summit. The A12 ultimately terminates at a grade-separated junction with the A8, marking the end of its winding and scenic route through western Kenya.

== History ==
The town of Busia was once the primary border crossing between Kenya and Uganda, with construction on the Mackinnon-Sclater Road commencing as early as 1890. This road, designed for oxcart travel, connected Mombasa to the Busia border crossing. However, its significance waned with the construction of the Uganda Railway, leading to a shift in the main border crossing to Malaba, located slightly north. During the British colonial era, a network of roads was established, with the route via Kisumu being a notable one, although the more northerly route via Eldoret received greater attention. In recent years, significant upgrades have been made, particularly in Kisumu. A grade-separated bypass was constructed between 2013 and 2014, improving traffic flow. Additionally, a trumpet interchange connecting to the A8 was completed at Mau Summit in 2017, further enhancing the road network's efficiency.

=== Road number history ===
The road was initially designated as the A109, a prominent route within the East African numbering system that spanned three countries. However, it was later reclassified as the B1, indicating a lower hierarchical status. This reclassification occurred during a period when the A104 motorway to the north was considered the primary connection. In 2016, the road underwent another renumbering, this time being elevated to the A12 designation. This change reflects a reevaluation of the road's importance within the regional transportation network.
