= Nairobi–Malaba Road =

Road in Kenya

A8 Road
- Nairobi–Malaba Road

Route information
- Part of TAH 8
- Maintained by Kenya National Highways Authority
- Length: 278 mi (447 km)

Major junctions
- East end: Nairobi
- Naivasha; Nakuru; Eldoret; Bungoma
- West end: Malaba

Location
- Country: Kenya
- Counties: Nairobi, Kiambu, Nakuru, Baringo, Uasin Gishu, Bungoma, Busia

Highway system
- Northern Corridor

The Nairobi–Malaba Road, also Nairobi–Uganda Road or A8 Road (Kenya) is part of the Kenyan section of the Trans-African Highway 8 - Lagos-Mombasa, and of the A8 Road in Kenya.

It is a major highway in Kenya, connecting Nairobi with the border town of Malaba at the international border with Uganda.

== Location ==
The road starts in the city of Nairobi and takes a general north-westerly direction through Naivasha, Nakuru, Eldoret and Bungoma, to end at Malaba, a distance of approximately 447 kilometres (278 mi) The coordinates of this road in the city of Eldoret, Uasin Gishu County are: 0°30'23.0"N, 35°17'57.0"E (Latitude:0.506389; Longitude:35.299167).

== Overview ==
This road, together with the Nairobi–Mombasa Road, are part of The Great North Road, which connects the landlocked countries of Burundi, Eastern DR Congo, Rwanda, Uganda and South Sudan to the Kenyan coast at Mombasa, on the Indian Ocean.

Due to a high volume of traffic, and the concentration of heavy-duty transport vehicles, the route is accident-prone, accounting for a large number of injuries and fatalities in the region. In 2013 alone, 3,179 people lost their lives in traffic accidents on the combined Mombasa–Malaba Road.

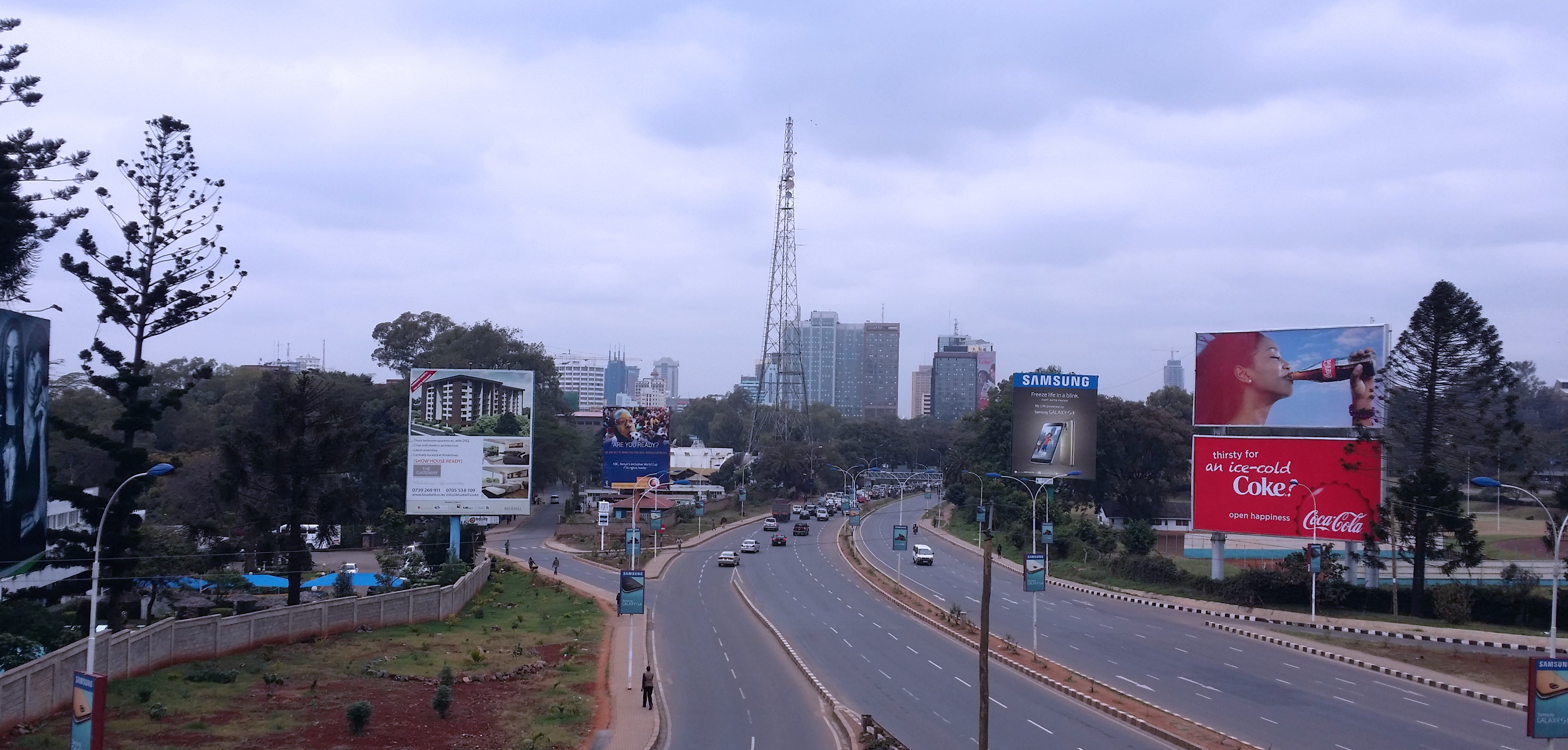
A104 heading towards Nairobi Central Business District

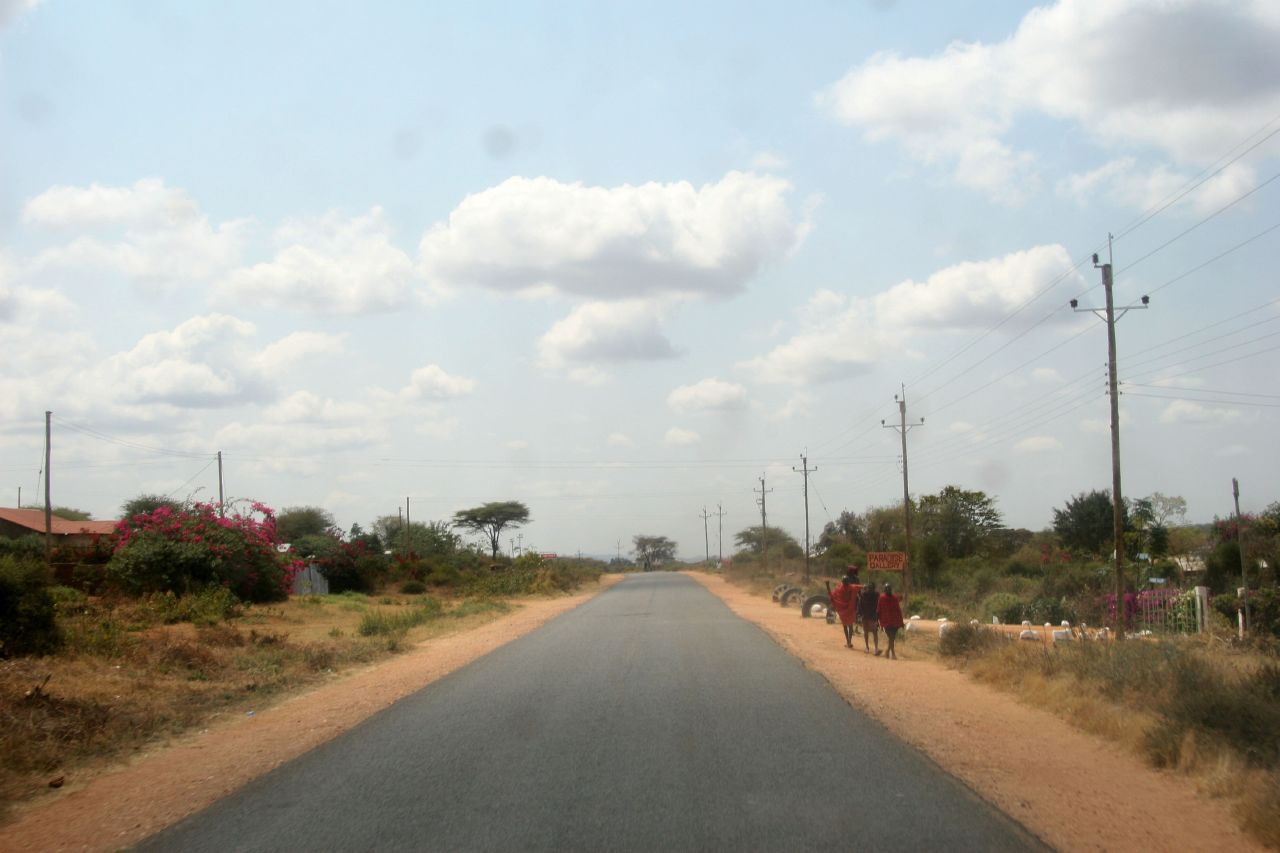
A104 at Kajiado

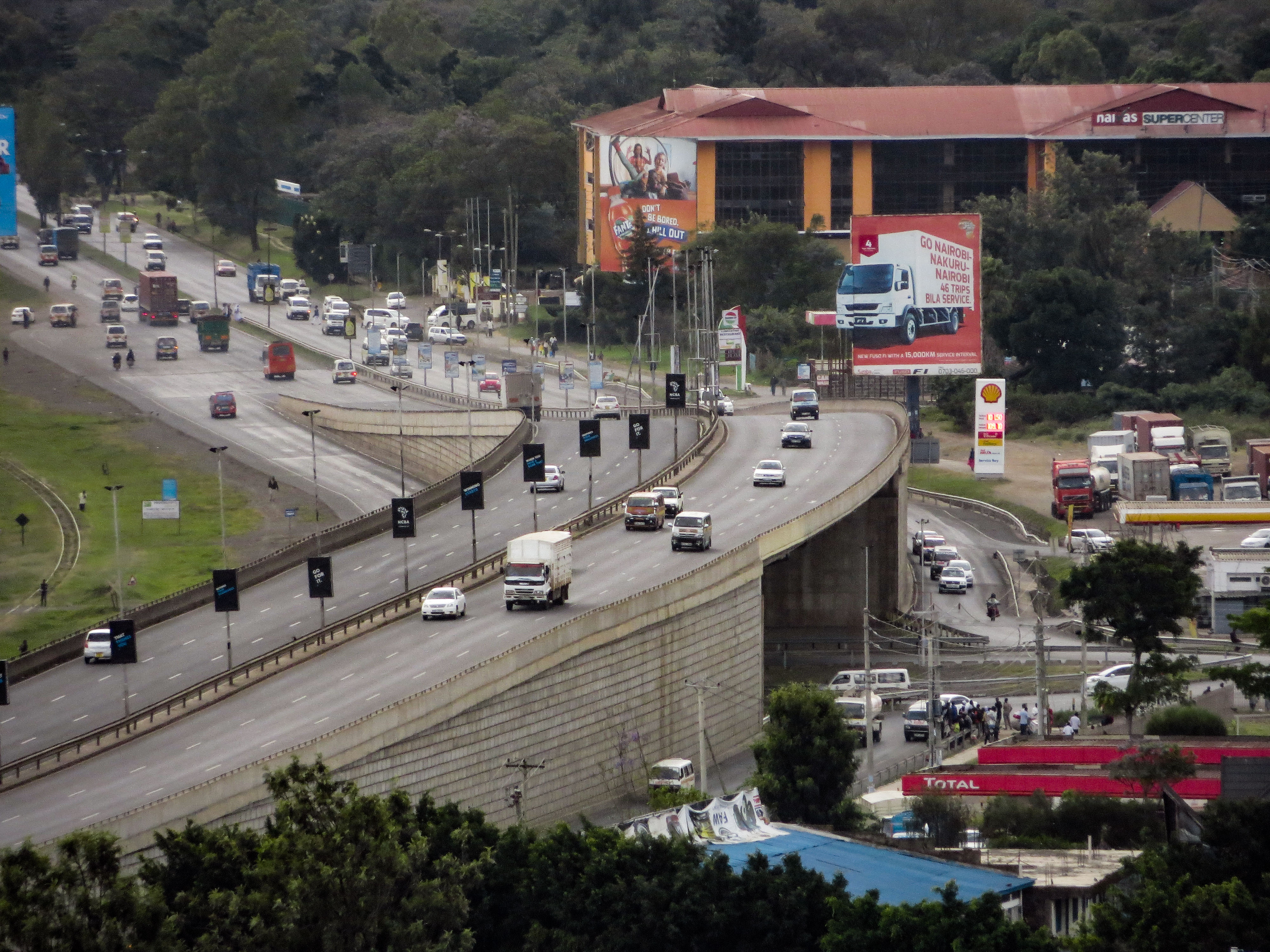
A 104 in Nakuru

== Intersections ==
This road has the following major intersections, listed from east towards the west.

1. Nairobi–Mombasa Road
2. Nairobi–Thika Road
3. Suam–Endebess–Kitale–Eldoret Road
4. Kisumu–Kakamega–Webuye–Kitale Road
5. Tororo–Malaba Road in Uganda

== Towns ==
The following towns, listed from east towards west, are located along the highway:

- Nairobi
- Limuru
- Naivasha
- Nakuru
- Timboroa
- Eldoret
- Bungoma
- Malaba

== See also ==
- Nairobi–Nakuru–Mau Summit Highway
- Dongo Kundu Bypass Highway
