= Mombasa–Nairobi Expressway =

Abandoned toll road project in Kenya

Coordinates: 02°25′04″S 37°57′39″E

Route information
- Length: 326 mi (525 km)
- History: Designated in 2019; Expected completion in 2026

Major junctions
- West end: Nairobi
- Voi
- East end: Mombasa

Location
- Country: Kenya

Highway system
- Transport in Kenya

The Mombasa–Nairobi Expressway or Nairobi–Mombasa Expressway, was a proposed four-lane toll highway in Kenya. The highway would have linked Nairobi, the capital and largest city of Kenya to Mombasa, the largest seaport of the country. Planned to run alongside the existing A8 (TAH 8) road in a separate trajectory, the expressway was expected to cut travel times from the current 6-10 hours, to approximately four hours.

== Location ==
The road was planned to start at Gitaru along the Nairobi–Nakuru Highway, approximately 20 kilometres (12 mi), northwest of Nairobi City centre, continuing in a general southeasterly direction, through Ngong, Ongata Rongai, Kisaju and Isinya to rejoin the existing Nairobi–Mombasa Road, just north of Konza. It would have passed through nine Kenya counties to end in the city of Mombasa at the Changamwe Roundabout, a total distance of about 525 kilometres (326 mi).

== Overview ==
The expressway was planned as a dual-carriage motorway with initially four lanes, expandable to six lanes, supporting sustained traffic speeds of up to 120 kilometres (75 mi) per hour with controlled access.

The expressway was intended to serve as "a central part of the national and regional transport system, helping promote trade and development in Kenya" and the regional neighbors of Uganda, Rwanda and the Democratic Republic of the Congo, Burundi and South Sudan.

The expressway was expected to improve roadway safety between the two cities. It was also expected to reduce logistics costs along the Mombasa-Nairobi transportation corridor. The construction phase was expected to create an estimated 500 construction jobs.

== History ==
In February 2015, the Kenyan government hired PwC to conduct a feasibility study on the commercial and technical viability of the Nairobi–Mombasa Expressway. The PwC report indicated the highway was viable if the highway operator collected a toll that would be used to retire the private capital used to develop the expressway. Starting about that time as well, the government of Kenya, through the Kenya National Highways Authority (KeNHA), began detailed talks with Bechtel International on a public-private partnership (PPP) to design, fund, construct and operate the highway.

== Construction costs ==
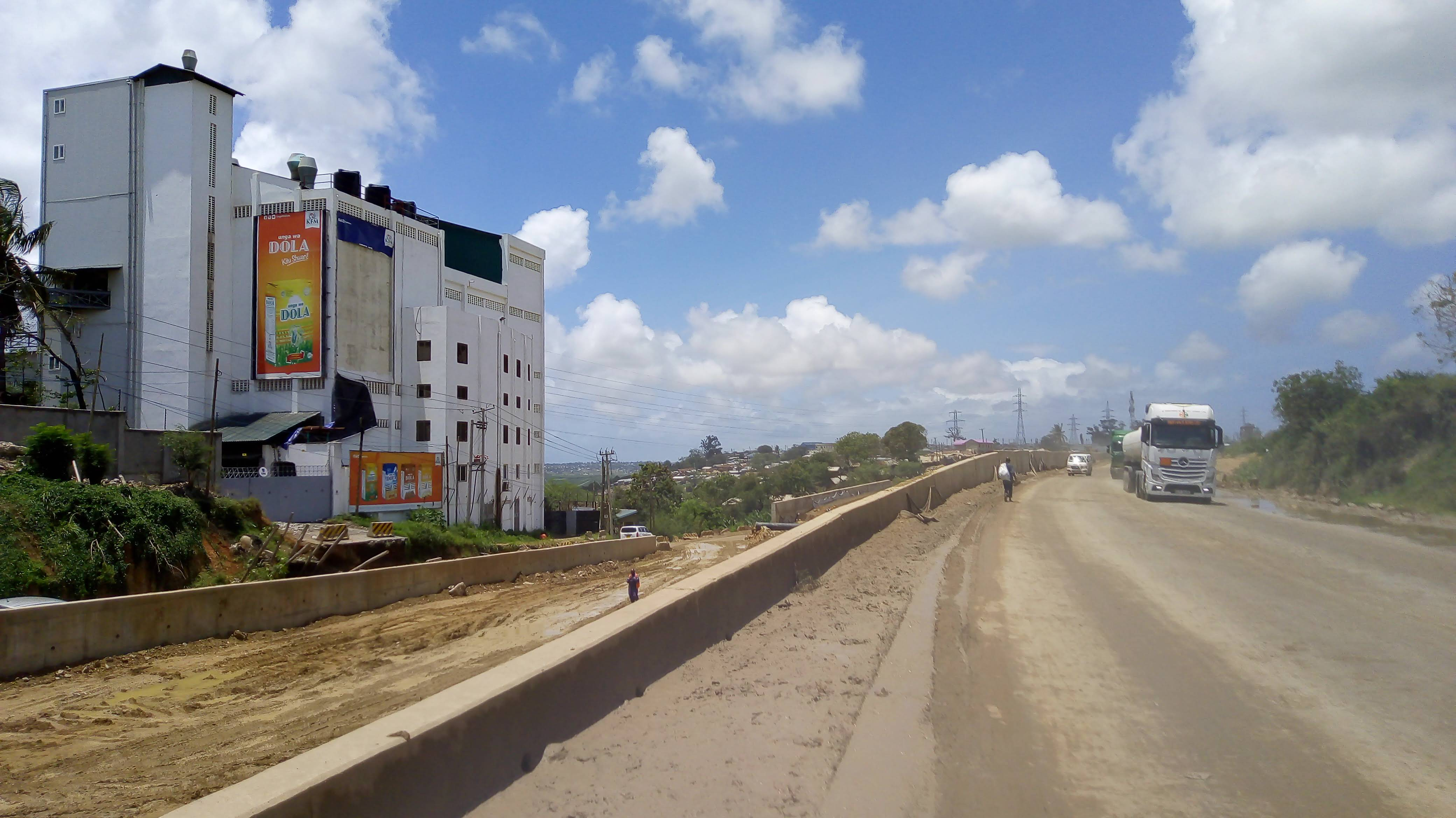
Mombasa-Nairobi Expressway under construction, 2019

Costs were budgeted at US$2.1 billion, partly funded by the Export–Import Bank of the United States and the US-based Overseas Private Investment Corporation.

== Timetable ==
In August 2017, KeNHA signed a binding agreement with Bechtel International, an American civil engineering and construction company to design, construct, and operate the proposed expressway in 10 sections with 19 interchanges. Construction was expected to start in July 2018, with completion of the first section in October 2019, and the entire expressway in 2024.

The initial project with Bechtel later stalled over the financial model.

In May 2024, president William Ruto, while on a state visit to the United States, witnessed the signing of an agreement between Kenya National Highways Authority (KeNHA) and Everstrong Capital, reviving the expressway project at a price of US$3.6 billion. Funding in the renewed push was expected to be sourced from "pension funds, international investors, development agencies and Kenyan private investors".

The project was finally abandoned in 2025 after its rejection by Kenya's Treasury, citing concerns about financing, land acquisition costs, and toll charges.

== See also ==
- List of roads in Kenya
- Transport in Kenya
