= Mau Summit–Malaba Expressway =

A8 Road
- Mau Summit–Malaba Expressway

Route information
- Part of TAH 8
- Length: 243 km (151 mi) Planned
- Status: Feasibility study

Major junctions
- East end: Mau Summit
- West end: Malaba, at the Uganda border

Location
- Country: Kenya
- Towns: Turbo, Webuye, Bungoma

Highway system
- Northern Corridor

Mau Summit

The Mau Summit–Malaba Expressway is a section of the A8 Mombasa-Malaba Road in Kenya. The A8 also forms the Kenyan section of the Trans-African Highway 8 - Lagos-Mombasa.

The planned 237-kilometre (147 mi), four-lane toll road is planned as an upgrade of the existing single-carriage road. It is envisaged as a public–private partnership project, with funding from the Asian Infrastructure Investment Bank. The route is planned to run from Mau Summit through Eldoret, Turbo, Webuye and Bungoma to Malaba on the Ugandan border, in direct continuation of the Nairobi–Nakuru–Mau Summit Highway.

The project has an estimated cost of KSh130 billion. Construction is planned to start in June 2027, with an estimated completion date yet to be confirmed.
