= A6 road (Kenya) =

Road in Kenya

A6 Road

Route information
- Maintained by Kenya National Highways Authority

Major junctions
- North end: Taveta
- South end: Mwatate

Location
- Country: Kenya

Highway system
- Transport in Kenya

A6 road is a road in Kenya which spans 113 kilometres and is an east-west connector between the Tanzanian border in Taveta to the A8 route at Voi.

== Route ==
The A6 highway begins at the Tanzanian border in Taveta, where the T15 road connects from Himo and the Kilimanjaro region. The road reaches an elevation of 800 meters above sea level and travels through a savannah landscape. It passes through Taita Hills before converging with the A8 highway at Voi.

== History ==
Initially designated the A23 road, it was renamed to the A6 in 2016.

In November 2013, a contract was awarded to pave the road and create a northern bypass around Taveta, with both projects being complete by 2017. The border crossing with Tanzania was expanded in 2014.
