= Kinshasa Highway =

Road in Uganda

The Kinshasa Highway is an informal name for a route across the Democratic Republic of the Congo into Uganda and beyond, consisting of paved highways in some places and seasonally impassable tracks in others. The name has gained currency for the role which long-distance truck drivers played in the early spread of AIDS in the 1980s (also described in the book The Hot Zone in Part 4). Although there is a paved road from Kinshasa to Kikwit and a little beyond, National Road 1, and there are paved roads between Kisangani, Bukavu, Kampala and Nairobi, there has never been a paved highway across the centre of the Congo joining Kinshasa and Kikwit to Bukavu. Neither is there any coordinating authority for a 'Kinshasa Highway' or 'Autoroute de Kinshasa'.

== Highways in DR Congo ==
One of the most reliable indicators of highway condition in Africa are the Michelin maps which grade highway condition, in part from traveller's reports. The 2000 edition for 'Africa Central and South' indicates three 'transcontinental routes' between Kinshasa and Kisangani or Bukavu, all of them with very long stretches of road in the lowest category of highway condition, described as 'earth tracks likely to become impassable in bad weather'. The area has some of the highest rainfall in Africa. The editions published in the 1980s and 1990s indicate the same, an absence of paved roads through 750 km of rainforest from central to eastern DR Congo.

One reason for the absence of highways through the rain forests and swamps of the central Congo, in addition to the difficulty of building and maintaining them, is that river transport has traditionally been used to a much greater extent than road transport in the country.

=== Spread of HIV-1 ===
It was said that the route of the Kinshasa Highway had to be carved out from thick jungle, and that after it was paved, AIDS spread quicker, as carriers of the disease travelled along its length on board cars and trucks, from populated areas to more isolated rural areas. Prostitutes at truck stops helped spread the disease even faster, and it was also referred to as the 'AIDS Highway'. This description may apply to a few highways which have been paved in the eastern Congo, such as the Kisangani-Bukavu road. It applies to an extent to the road across Uganda and into Kenya but this road was constructed and paved several decades before the emergence of AIDS.

It has been established from analysing archived samples of HIV, that HIV-1 originated in the Kinshasa of the 1920s and spread through the railroad into Brazzaville and the mining province, Katanga, long before AIDS was recognized in the early 80s.

== See also ==
Trans-African Highway network

- Lagos-Mombasa Highway
- Trans–West African Coastal Highway
