= Trans-Sahara (disambiguation) =

Trans-Sahara may refer to:

- Trans-Saharan trade route
- Trans-Sahara Highway, a transnational highway
- Operation Enduring Freedom – Trans Sahara
