= Algeria–Niger border =

International border

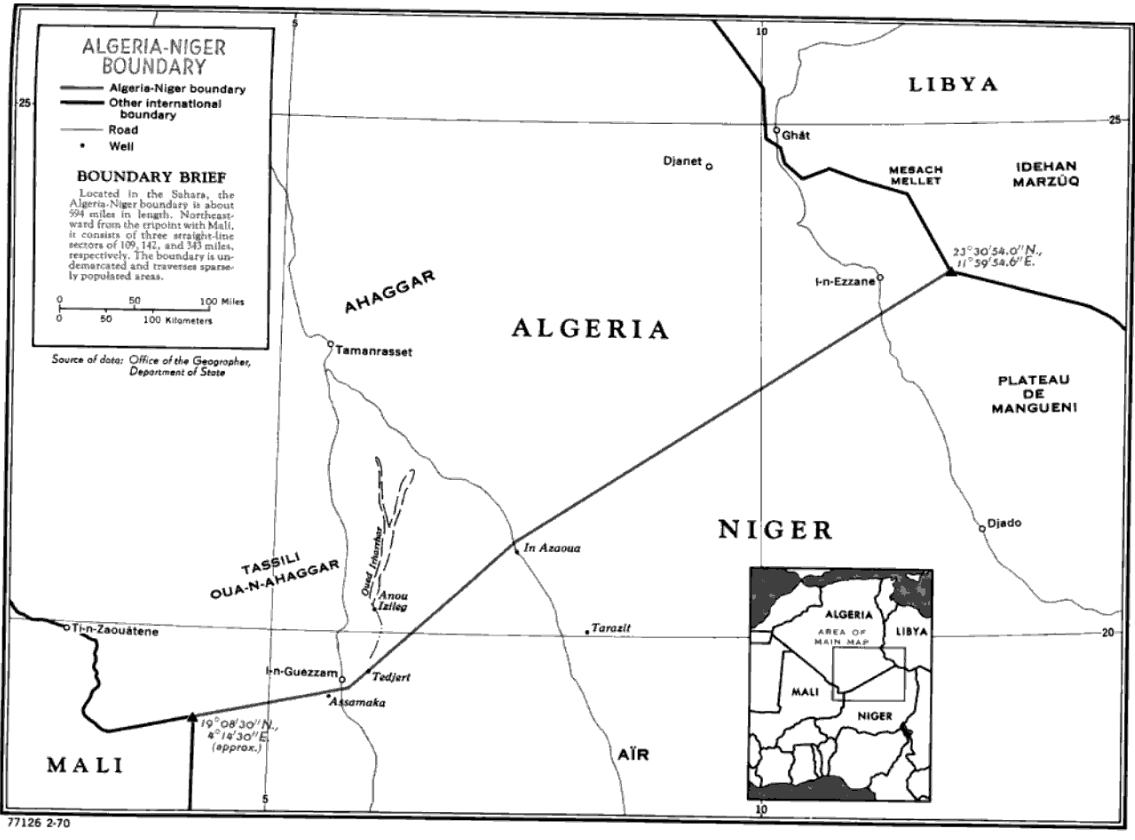
Map of the Algeria-Niger border

The Algeria–Niger border is 951 kilometres (591 miles) in length and runs from the tripoint with Mali in the west to the tripoint with Libya in the east.

== Description ==
The border consists of three straight lines proceeding northeast between the tripoints with Mali and Libya. The westernmost line runs from the Malian tripoint to the Agadez-Tamanrasset highway for 175 km (109 mi); the middle section runs for 229 km (142 mi) up to the vicinity of I-n-Azaoua; and the final and longest segment runs for 552 km (343 mi) up to the Libyan tripoint. The boundary runs entirely within the Sahara desert.

== History ==
The 1880s saw an intense competition between the European powers for territories in Africa, a process known as the Scramble for Africa. The process culminated in the Berlin Conference of 1884, in which the European nations concerned agreed upon their respective territorial claims and the rules of engagements going forward. As a result of this, France gained control of the upper valley of the Niger River (roughly equivalent to the areas of modern Mali and Niger). France had already conquered most of northern Algeria during the period 1830-47, incorporating it as an integral part of France. France occupied the area of modern Niger in 1900, declaring it a military territory, ruled originally from Zinder. Niger was originally included, along with modern Mali and Burkina Faso, within the Upper Senegal and Niger colony, however it was split off in 1911 and became a constituent of the federal colony of French West Africa (Afrique occidentale française, abbreviated AOF). In the meantime in Algeria France had been pushing south from the littoral region, conquering much of the Algerian Sahara in 1902. A boundary between French West Africa and French Algeria (i.e. what are now Algeria’s borders with Mauritania, Mali and Niger) was agreed on 7 June 1905 by the Commandant of Upper Senegal and Niger and the Military Commander of the Department de l'Oasis within French Algeria. The border was further defined by the Niamey Convention of June 1909.

As the movement for decolonisation grew in the post-Second World War era, France gradually granted more political rights and representation for their sub-Saharan African colonies, culminating in the granting of broad internal autonomy to French West Africa in 1958 within the framework of the French Community. Eventually, in August 1960, Niger was granted full independence. The situation in Algeria proved much less clear-cut, owing to the large community of French settlers in Algeria, and independence was only granted in July 1962 after a long and bloody war. At that point the Algeria–Niger border became an international frontier between two sovereign states.

In recent years the border region has gained renewed focus, due to increasing numbers of African migrants crossing it, seeking to reach Europe; in 2017 Algeria began policing the border more thoroughly, drawing criticism as deported migrants were stranded at the remote frontier with no provisions.

== Border crossings ==
The only official border crossing is on the Trans-Sahara Highway between the towns of In Guezzam (Algeria) and Assamakka (Niger). The area is generally deemed unsafe for travel by third party governments.

== See also ==
- Algeria–Niger relations
