= A5 road (Kenya) =

Road in Kenya

A5 Road

Route information
- Maintained by Kenya National Highways Authority

Major junctions
- North end: Emali
- South end: Loitokitok

Location
- Country: Kenya

Highway system
- Transport in Kenya

The A5 road is a road in Kenya stretching 114 kilometers in a north–south direction through the southern region of the country. Beginning in Emali, the route traverses the landscape before ultimately reaching the Tanzanian border at Loitokitok, providing a connection between the two nations.

== Route ==
The A5 highway originates in Emali, a town perched at an elevation of 1,100 meters above sea level, approximately 100 kilometers southeast of Kenya's capital city, Nairobi. From Emali, where it intersects with the A8, the A5 embarks on a southerly journey, traversing the tropical savannah and offering vistas of Mount Kilimanjaro. This modern, paved road winds its way through several quaint towns, with Loitokitok being the most notable, before reaching the Tanzanian border. Here, a state-of-the-art border crossing facilitates seamless travel, and on the Tanzanian side, the T21 road continues along the slopes of Kilimanjaro, ultimately leading to the town of Himo.

== History ==
The A5 highway has undergone a transformation in its designation, previously known as the C102, which shared the same route from Emali to the Tanzanian border. In 2016, the road was reclassified as the A5, reflecting its significance in the regional transportation network. Given its crucial role in funneling tourists to the Kilimanjaro region, the road had likely been paved for many years. A major overhaul in 2011 further modernized the A5, enhancing its quality and safety. Notably, the connecting road in Tanzania, although paved later than the A5, has since completed the seamless journey for travelers crossing the border.
