= A8 road (Kenya) =

Road in Kenya

A8 Road
- Mombasa-Malaba Road

Route information
- Part of Lagos–Mombasa Highway (TAH 8)
- Maintained by Kenya National Highways Authority

Major junctions
- North end: Malaba
- South end: Mombasa

Location
- Country: Kenya

Highway system
- Transport in Kenya

The A8 Road in Kenya is the Kenyan section of the Trans-African Highway 8 - Lagos–Mombasa.

The road spans 923 kilometers and connects the Malaba Kenya-Uganda border point to the port city of Mombasa on the Indian Ocean, passing through Eldoret and Nairobi. The road is one of the main transportation routes in Kenya, providing an east–west connection that also serves as Kenya's main route for international traffic to and from Uganda.

== Route ==
=== Malaba-Mau Summit ===
Article: Mau Summit-Malaba Expressway

The A8 highway begins at the Malaba border crossing with Uganda. From there, it extends eastward across the Kenyan highlands at an elevation over 1,100 meters above sea level. The road is paved and gradually increases in elevation to over 2,000 meters above sea level near Eldoret. The route passes through a rural area with a moderate population density and no large towns. There is a short section near Webuye where the A8 shares its route with the A1 highway.

==== Planned expansion ====
The Government of Kenya has announced plans to expand the Malaba-Mau Summit section of the A8 to a dual carriage expressway at an estimated cost of KES 130 billion. Construction is planned to start in June 2027, with an estimated completion date yet to be confirmed.

=== Mau Summit-Nairobi ===
Article: Nairobi - Mau Summit Highway

In the vicinity of Eldoret, a highway-style bypass circumvents the town to the west and south, while the original route passes through the center. From Eldoret, the A8 proceeds in a southerly direction, gaining elevation to reach its highest point of approximately 2,800 meters above sea level, roughly midway between Eldoret and Nakuru. This section traverses a plateau, forming a transitional zone between the Rift Valley's vast expanse. Notably, the equator crosses the route at this point. Near Moli, a grade-separated interchange connects to the A12 highway. The A8 then enters Nakuru, a town situated at 1,800 meters above sea level, featuring a 2x2 lane passage and a viaduct with 2x3 lanes. As the route continues south, the terrain becomes more undulating, with moderate elevation changes. The A4 converges at Gilgil. North of Nairobi, the road ascends to higher ground, reaching an elevation of approximately 2,700 meters, followed by a steady descent towards Nairobi.

==== Ongoing expansion ====
On September 30, 2020, VINCI Concessions, a French company, entered into a EUR 1.3 billion public-private partnership (PPP) 30-year concession to upgrade the 175-kilometer section between Mau Summit and Nairobi to a dual carriageway. In April 2024, the Kenyan government terminated the contract, citing concerns about affordability for local drivers, however incurring KES 6.2 billion (USD 47.7 million) in cancellation penalties.

Construction began in November 2025 under a revised public–private partnership, with China Road and Bridge Corporation upgrading the Rironi–Gilgil section and the alternative route through Mai Mahiu, while Shandong High-Speed Group is responsible for Gilgil–Mau Summit. In October 2026, President William Ruto announced that the projected would be completed by April 2027, two months earlier than the initial June deadline.

=== Nairobi Region ===
From Limuru, the A8 highway features dual 2x2 lanes and begins its descent into the Nairobi metropolitan area, a vast urban expanse situated at approximately 1,700 meters above sea level. To facilitate through traffic, the Nairobi Southern Bypass offers an alternative route around the city, while the Nairobi Expressway, a toll road elevated on viaducts, provides a central passage. Notably, the A8 shares dual designation with the A2 Moyale-Namanga (TAH 4 Cape-Cairo) road within Nairobi. South of the city center, the A8 continues as a dual-lane road, providing access to Jomo Kenyatta International Airport. In Athi River, the A2 diverges southward, while the A8 proceeds with a subsequent stretch featuring dual 2x2 lanes.

=== Nairobi-Mombasa ===
Article: Nairobi-Mombasa Road

Beyond the Nairobi region, the A8 traverses a more sparsely populated and arid area, characterized by a prolonged stretch of dry savannah en route to the coastal city of Mombasa. The road narrows to a single-lane paved thoroughfare, gradually descending to sea level. The terrain transitions to a flatter landscape, punctuated by occasional low-lying hills. The route alternates between lengthy straight sections and more winding passages. At Emali, the A5 branches off towards Himo, Tanzania, while at Voi, the A6 diverges towards the same destination. Approximately 100 kilometers west of Mombasa, the dry savannah gives way to a more humid, tropical lowland. The A8 eventually reaches Mombasa, a major port city, where it merges with city roads leading to the central business district. Alternatively, the Dongo Kundu Bypass Highway offers a branch route to the port of Mombasa. The A8 terminates in the old town of Mombasa, converging with the A7 highway.

==== Planned expansion ====
In 2017, KeNHA entered an agreement with Bechtel to develop an expressway between Nairobi and Mombasa under a public-private partnership toll road concession.. The road was to run in parallel with the existing A8 Road, along a separate trajectory.

Construction was slated to begin in 2018, but initially stalled due to Kenya's high debt levels, and differences between Bechtel and the government over the proposed toll road model.

In May 2024, a new agreement was signed with Everstrong Capital, an American investor, to construct the expressway along roughly the same trajectory for $3.6 billion under a new public-private partnership toll road concession. The Treasury's PPP Committee eventually rejected the project in July 2025, citing concerns about financing, land acquisition costs, and toll charges.

In 2026, a revised proposal was announced to widen the existing 461-kilometre road to at least four lanes under a toll road model.

== History ==
=== Colonial period ===
During the British colonial era, significant investments were made in Kenya's infrastructure. In 1890, construction began on the Mackinnon-Sclater road, a dirt track suitable for oxcarts, connecting Mombasa to Busia on the Ugandan border. This early road followed the present-day A8 and A12 routes through western Kenya. However, its importance was soon eclipsed by the completion of the Uganda Railway in 1901, a rail line linking Mombasa to Kisumu on Lake Victoria. This railway created a vital connection between the Indian Ocean port city of Mombasa and Kisumu, later extended to Uganda, eliminating the need for lake crossings. The Kenyan highlands, a productive agricultural region with high population density and significant coffee and tea production, were already relatively developed during the colonial period. As a result, a network of paved roads was established in this area, setting it apart from other parts of East Africa.

=== Independent Kenya ===
Upon gaining independence, Kenya inherited a relatively well-developed road network from British colonial rule, surpassing many other former colonies. The A8 route was the most advanced road in Kenya at the time, with the Busia border crossing initially serving as the primary entry point between Kenya and Uganda. However, the Malaba border crossing later gained prominence. During the 1980s and 1990s, the A8 remained Kenya's primary paved road. In Nairobi, the capital city, the road is remarkably well-developed by African standards, featuring 2x3 lanes and roundabouts. Notably, the section between downtown Nairobi and Jomo Kenyatta International Airport was expanded to 2x2 lanes as early as 1978. The northern stretch from Nairobi to Limuru was also widened to a dual carriageway over 35 kilometers, incorporating partial grade separation. Later expansions included the southern section from Nairobi to Athi River, completed in 2010, and the introduction of a junction with the A2 motorway in Nairobi in 2012. In 2014, the northern segment between Eldoret and the Ugandan border underwent modernization and widening.

In 2019, a flyover was completed at Webuye, facilitating a smoother intersection with the A1 highway. Between 2010 and 2016, the Nairobi Southern Bypass was constructed to divert traffic around the city of Nairobi. Additionally, 2019 marked the commencement of the Nairobi Expressway project, a toll road designed to traverse the city center on an elevated viaduct above the A8 highway. This toll road was opened to traffic in 2022. In August 2017, construction began on the 32-kilometer Eldoret bypass, with work resuming in March 2018 after a brief pause. However, progress was significantly impeded from 2019 due to issues related to land acquisition. Construction resumed in March 2021, and the Eldoret bypass was officially inaugurated in December 2022.

== Road number history ==
Historically, Kenya, Tanzania, and Uganda shared a unified road numbering system, established by the East African Community likely in the 1960s or 1970s. Within this framework, the route was designated as A104, spanning from Kampala to Arusha via Eldoret and Nairobi. The eastern section was identified as A109, connecting Uganda to Nairobi and Mombasa via Kisumu. Notably, the stretch between Molo and Nairobi featured dual numbering as both A104 and A109. In 2016, the corridor was renumbered, and the route was reassigned as A8. This designation aligns with its status as part of Trans-Africa Highway 8, which may have influenced the choice of the A8 numbering.
