= Nairobi–Mombasa Road =

Road in Kenya

Coordinates: 01°30′15″S 37°05′20″E

A8 Road
- Nairobi–Mombasa Section of A8 / TAH 8

Route information
- Part of Lagos–Mombasa Highway (TAH 8)
- Length: 482 km (300 mi)

Major junctions
- Northwest end: Lang'ata Road–Lusaka Road–Uhuru Highway, Nairobi
- Southeast end: Abdel Nasser Road–Digo Road–Langoni Road, Mombasa

Location
- Country: Kenya
- Counties: Nairobi, Machakos, Kajiado, Makueni, Taita-Taveta, Kwale, Mombasa
- Major cities: Nairobi, Athi River, Kibwezi, Voi, Samburu, Mombasa

Highway system
- Northern Corridor

Mombasa Road, also known as the Nairobi–Mombasa Highway, Nairobi–Mombasa Road, Mombasa–Nairobi Road or A8 Road (Kenya) is the main road between Nairobi, Kenya's capital and largest city and Mombasa, the country's largest port city. The road is a component of the Northern Corridor.

It is part of the Trans-African Highway 8 - Lagos–Mombasa.

== Location ==
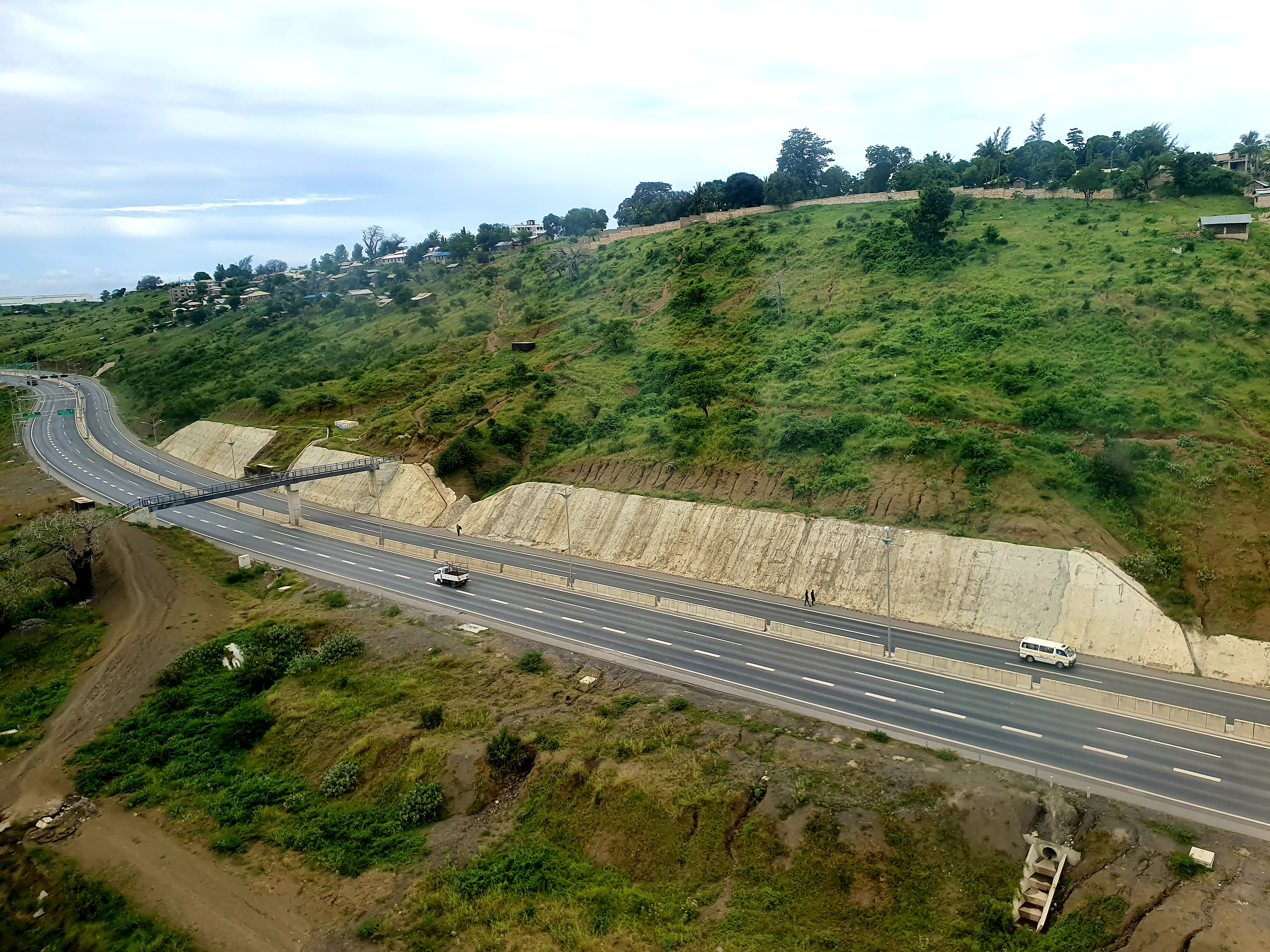
View from the Standard Gauge Railway to Mombasa city

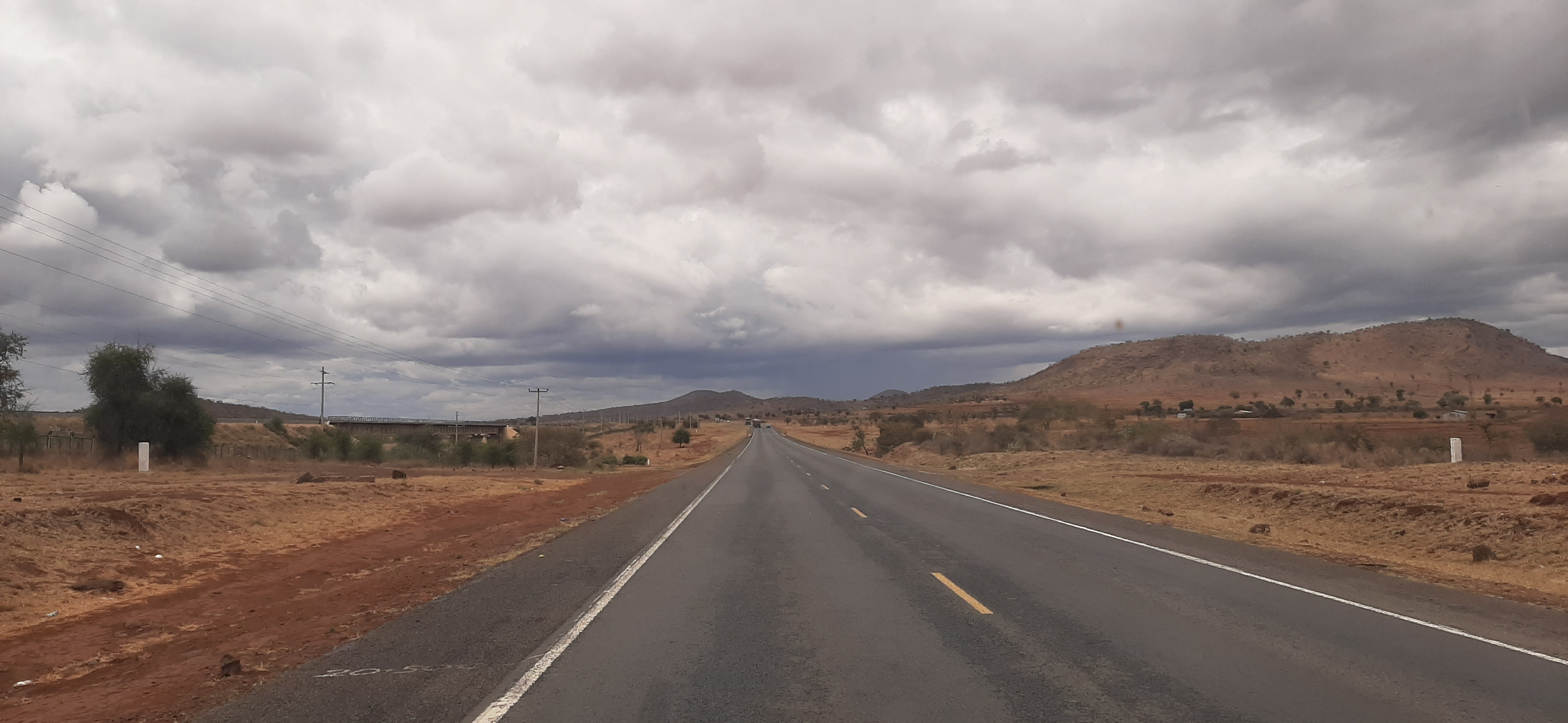
The A8 Road near Tsavo junction (2019)

The road starts in the city of Nairobi, at the confluence of Langata Road, Uhuru Highway and Lusaka Road, immediately west of DHL House. It continues in a general southeasterly direction, through seven Kenya Counties to end in the city of Mombasa at the confluence of Digo Road, Langoni Road and Abdel Nasser Road, a total distance of about 482 kilometres (300 mi). The coordinates of this road south of the town of Athi River, Machakos County are: 01°30'15.0"S, 37°05'20.0"E (Latitude:-1.504167; Longitude:37.088889).

== Overview ==
This road, together with its sister road, Nairobi–Malaba Road, is part of the Great North Road, that links the Kenyan coast to the land-locked countries of Burundi, Eastern DR Congo, Rwanda, Uganda and South Sudan. The road moves more than 50 percent of all goods traded in the East African Community. Due to the volume of traffic, and the concentration of heavy-duty transport vehicles, the route is accident-prone, accounting for a large number of injuries and fatalities in the region. In 2013 alone, 3,179 people lost their lives in traffic accidents on the combined Mombasa–Malaba Road.

== Expansion ==
The government of Kenya announced plans already in 2016 to expand the road to dual carriageway, with an invitation for bids expected later that year.

In 2017, Bechtel was contracted to build a separate four-lane toll expressway along a parallel, but different trajectory. The project stalled over financing, with Bechtel declining the proposed Build-Operate-Transfer toll road model.

In 2023, the government gave conditional approval to Usahihi Expressway, a toll road project by Everstrong Capital on roughly the same trajectory as the previous proposal. The Treasury's PPP Committee eventually rejected the new proposal in July 2025, citing concerns about financing, land acquisition costs, and toll charges.

In 2026, a revised proposal was announced to widen the existing 461-kilometre road to at least four lanes under a toll road model.

== Towns ==
The following towns, listed from west towards the east, are located along the highway:

- Nairobi
- Athi River
- Machakos Junction
- Konza
- Sultan Hamud
- Emali
- Simba
- Kiboko
- Makindu
- Kiunduani
- Mbuinzau
- Nguumo
- Kibwezi
- Mtito Andei
- Voi
- Maungu
- Mackinnon Road
- Taru
- Samburu, Kwale County
- Maji ya Chumvi
- Mariakani
- Mazeras
- Miritini
- Jomvu
- Mombasa

== Intersections ==
The following major intersections lie along the Nairobi–Mombasa Road, listed from the west towards the east:

1. The Nairobi–Malaba Road, also referred to as the Nairobi–Uganda Road
2. The Nairobi–Namanga Road, part of the Nairobi–Arusha Road
3. The Voi–Taveta Road
4. The Mariakani–Kaloleni–Mavueni Road
5. The Dongo Kundu Bypass Highway
6. The Mombasa–Garissa Road
7. The Malindi–Bagamoyo Highway.

== See also ==
- Trans-African Highway network
- List of roads in Kenya
