= Lagos–Mombasa Highway =

Trans-African Road

Trans-African Highway 8

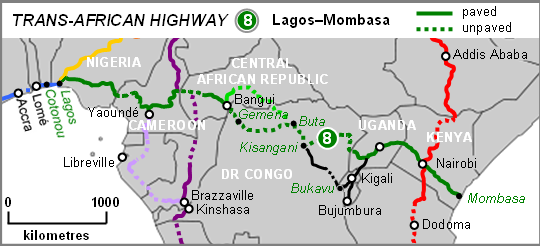

Route information
- Length: 10,269 km (6,381 mi)

Major junctions
- West end: TAH 2 and TAH 7 in Lagos, Nigeria
- TAH 3 Yaoundé, Cameroon; TAH 4 in Nairobi, Kenya
- East end: Mombasa

Location

Highway system
- Transport in
← TAH 7	→ TAH 9

The Lagos–Mombasa Highway (also known as the Mombasa-Lagos Highway) or TAH 8 is Trans-African Highway 8 and is the principal road route between West and East Africa. It has a length of 6,259 km (3,889 mi) and is contiguous with the Dakar-Lagos Highway with which it will form (when complete) the longest east-west crossing of the continent for a total distance of 10,269 km (6,381 mi). Its main importance at the moment is connecting West Africa with Southern Africa via Yaoundé and Gabon because the section through the Democratic Republic of the Congo is unpaved and difficult.

== Route ==
Part of the transcontinental road network under development by the United Nations Economic Commission for Africa (UNECA), the African Development Bank (ADB), and the African Union, the route crosses Nigeria, Cameroon, Central African Republic, Democratic Republic of the Congo, Uganda, and Kenya.

=== Nigeria and Cameroon ===
This section is all paved, the route is Lagos-Enugu-Bamenda-Douala-Yaounde-Abong Mbang-Garoua Boulai, which is the border of the Central African Republic. The border section Ekok-Mamfe was paved in 2015. An important branch goes southward from Yaounde to Gabon and Brazzaville which is paved as far as south Gabon and is presently the main road between southern and northwest Africa.

=== Crossing the Congo River basin ===
Although the highway carries much traffic on its paved sections in Nigeria, Cameroon, Uganda and Kenya, at present it is not a practical route between West and East since the central section across the Democratic Republic of the Congo consists only of tracks, which are impassable after the frequent heavy rain. The existence of dense rainforest, and the need for frequent river crossings, present huge challenges to road engineers. With no easy alternative routes, east-west trade has to go via air, or sea, and is consequently severely limited.

The highway was considered to run from Bangassou in the Central African Republic to Buta in DR Congo via Bondo, but after the Congo Civil Wars, the tracks between those towns became impassable. The DR Congo advises that the track from Zongo (across the river from Bangui) via Gemena, Lisala and Bumba to Buta is a higher priority for rehabilitation, and would recommend that alternative.

In eastern DR Congo, the route goes from Kisangani to the Ugandan border post at Mpondwe, via Komanda and Beni. This earth track is also frequently impassable. The longer route from Kisangani to the Rwanda border at Bukavu using National Road No. 2 may be preferable as the road is partly paved, though since the war it has not been in use south of Walikale.

From Bukavu a paved highway reaches Kigali (Rwanda) and connects to the existing route at Mbarara in Uganda.

=== Great Lakes region and eastern section ===
The Lagos–Mombasa Highway's eastern section has been paved for several decades and is the principal highway between the African Great Lakes region and the sea.

The highway from Bujumbura (Burundi) through Kigali to Mbarara can also be considered a feeder road connecting land-locked Burundi and Rwanda to the sea at Mombasa.

Since transport across the DR Congo is severely limited, the eastern section is also the principal road trade route for the central-eastern and north-eastern part of that country. In the aftermath of the Second Congo War, aid agencies and charities ship relief supplies there along the highway.

The eastern section is probably the origin of the term 'Kinshasa Highway', a metaphor for the spread of HIV/AIDS in Africa along trade routes, which has been researched along the highway in Uganda and Kenya. Some sources mistakenly describe the Kinshasa Highway as a real paved road between Uganda and Kinshasa, but there has never been more than rough bush tracks across DR Congo between east and west.

=== Uganda and Kenya ===
The route passes through Kampala and Jinja in Uganda, crossing into Kenya at Malaba. It continues through Eldoret, Nakuru and Nairobi to Mombasa, forming part of the Northern Corridor.

The entire Kenyan section, known as the A8 Road in Kenya, is a at various stages of ongoing or planned upgrades to dual carriageway standard.

The 243-kilometre Malaba–Mau Summit section via Eldoret, currently a single carriageway, is undergoing feasibility study. Works on the envisaged dualing are scheduled to start in July 2027.

As of November 2026, the Mau Summit–Nairobi section, the road is being expanded to a dual carriageway.

The Nairobi section between Rironi and Athi River is already a dual carriageway, with the Nairobi Expressway as a recent capacity addition, and the Nairobi Southern Bypass helping divert transit traffic past the city centre. The TAH 4, known as the A2 Road in Kenya, shares its trajectory with the TAH 8/A8 between Museum Hill in Nairobi and Athi River.

Plans were announced in October 2026 to widen the existing Nairobi–Mombasa section to at least four lanes and introduce tolls.

The eastern section of the Lagos–Mombasa Highway is also the only part of the whole network where the name 'Trans-African Highway' is in common use and is seen on a few road signs.

== See also ==
- Kinshasa Highway
- Trans-African Highway network
- Trans–West African Coastal Highway
