= Cairo–Dakar Highway =

African road

Trans-African Highway 1

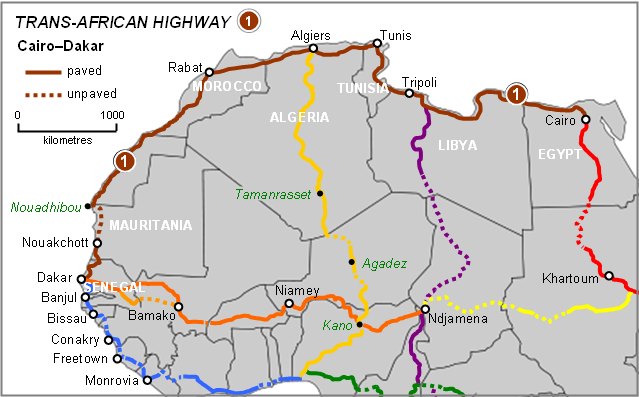

Route information
- Length: 8,636 km (5,366 mi)

Major junctions
- East end: TAH 4 in Cairo, Egypt
- TAH 3 in Tripoli, Libya; TAH 2 in Algiers, Algeria
- West end: TAH 5 and TAH 7 in Dakar, Senegal

Location

Highway system
- Transport in
→ TAH 2

The Cairo–Dakar Highway or TAH 1 is Trans-African Highway 1 in the transcontinental road network being developed by the United Nations Economic Commission for Africa (UNECA), the African Development Bank (ADB), and the African Union. The major part of the highway between Tripoli and Nouakchott has been constructed under a project of the Arab Maghreb Union.

The highway has a length of 8,636 kilometres (5,366 mi) and runs along the Mediterranean coast of North Africa, continuing down the Atlantic coast of North-West Africa. As of 2003, all of the highway was completed and paved, except for a 569-km section within Mauritania between Nouadhibou and Nouakchott.

It is substantially complete except for a few kilometres on the Western Sahara-Mauritania border where there is currently only a desert track. The Nouadhibou-Nouakchott section was paved in 2005 (fr:Transport en Mauritanie). It joins with the Dakar-Lagos Highway ( TAH 7) to form a north–south route between Rabat and Monrovia across the Sahara and around the western extremity of the continent.

Since 1994 the land border between Morocco and Algeria has been closed completely, so the Cairo–Dakar Highway cannot be used in its entirety. Construction in Tunisia continues.

== See also ==
- Maghreb highway
- Trans-African Highway network
- Trans–West African Coastal Highway
