= Simba, Kenya =

Simba
- Location within Kenya
- Coordinates: 2.158°S 37.591°E
- Country: Kenya
- County: Makueni County
- Time zone: UTC+3 (EAT)

Simba is a small village along the Mombasa Road (A109), some 140 kilometers southeast of Nairobi, between Emali and Kiboko. It is situated on the boundary of the Makueni and Kajiado counties. The Simba Plains are located some 10 kilometers due south.

The top of Simba hill is 1,226 metres above sea level. The area around Simba is hilly towards west, but flat towards the east. The highest point nearby is 1,449 metres above sea level, 2.4 km west of Simba. Around Simba, it is quite densely populated, with 108 inhabitants per sq. km. The nearest larger community is Makueni, 3.2 km east of Simba. The surroundings of Simba are mainly savanna, and there are several named forests.

A savanna climate prevails in the area, with annual average temperature of 23 °C. The warmest month is October, when the average temperature is 26 °C, and the coldest is April, at 20 °C. The average annual precipitation is 840 millimeters. The highest rainfall month is November, with an average of 201 mm, and the driest is July, with only 1 mm rainfall on average.
