= Nairobi Expressway =

Kenyan toll highway

Coordinates: 01°15′51″S 36°44′52″E

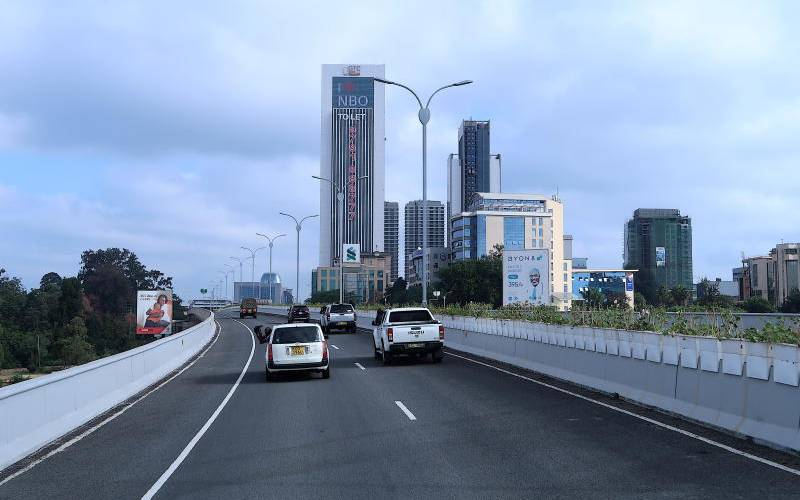
- The Expressway in Chiromo

Route information
- Length: 17 mi (27 km)
- History: Designated in 2019; Completion in 2022; 4 years ago

Major junctions
- South end: Jomo Kenyatta International Airport
- Likoni Road Junction; James Gichuru Road Junction
- North end: Rironi

Location
- Country: Kenya

Highway system
- Transport in Kenya

The Nairobi Expressway is a 27 kilometres (17 mi) toll road in Kenya, connecting Jomo Kenyatta International Airport to Nairobi's Westlands area, that has been constructed under a public-private partnership between the government of Kenya and China Road and Bridge Corporation (CRBC).

== Location ==
The 27.1-kilometer road starts from Mlolongo passing through JKIA and Nairobi's CBD to the James Gichuru junction along Waiyaki Way. From Mlolongo, the road links up via an interchange with Airport South Road, to Jomo Kenyatta International Airport, along the Nairobi-Mombasa Road. The highway continues along the existing roadway to the Likoni Road Junction, a distance of approximately 10 kilometres (6 mi).

From the Likoni Road junction, the toll highway continues northwards to the James Gichuru Road junction, a distance of approximately 13.5 kilometres (8 mi).

== Overview ==
The Nairobi Expressway is aimed at easing traffic and provide a seamless access to the Jomo Kenyatta International Airport and its environs. The work involves expansion of the existing road to four-lanes one-way (8 lanes total), with foot paths, drainage channels, overpass bridges and street lighting.

== Construction and funding ==
The government of Kenya had contracted with China Road and Bridge Corporation (CRBC) to build this toll road on a public-private partnership (PPP) basis. CRBC used its own money to construct the road expansion, interchanges, and toll stations. The company will collect the toll fees until their investment is recovered, then the road will revert to government.

The road expansion is to be done in stages. The World Bank had indicated interest in funding the road expansion, but those plans have been overtaken by events. The cost of the toll highway is quoted as between KSh51 billion (US$510 million) and KSh65 billion (US$650 million).

== Recent events ==
In April 2022, 98.4 Capital FM reported that the construction of the expressway was complete and was awaiting political and commercial commissioning. The road project, which cost over US$560 million to build, is expected to reduce travel time from Jomo Kenyatta International Airport (JKIA) to the Nairobi central business district to between 15 and 20 minutes, instead of the one hour it took during off-peak and two hours it took during peak hours, before the expressway was built.

== Junctions and interchanges ==
Nairobi Expressway junctions and exits
Name	Access	Exit number
Waiyaki Way	Western terminus	Exit 1
The Mall Exit	No access from either side, eastbound entrance	Exit 2
Thika Highway	Access from Mombasa Road (A104)	Exit 3
Haile Selassie	Full access	Exit 4
Capital Center (CBD Nairobi)	Full access	Exit 5
Southern Bypass	Full access	Exit 6
JKIA North Road (Embakasi)	Full access	Exit 7
Jomo Kenyatta International Airport	Full access	Exit 8
Mombasa Road (A104)	Eastern terminus	Exit 9

== See also ==
- List of roads in Kenya
- A104 road (Kenya)
- Transport in Kenya
