= Evolution of motorway construction in African countries =

The first table includes countries that pioneered the construction of motorways in the 20th century

Rank	Country (or dependent territory)	1981	1982	1983	1984	1985	1986	1987	1988	1989	1990	1991	1992	1993	1994	1995	1996	1997	1998	1999	2000
1	Egypt	220	220	220	220	220	220	220	220	220	220	220	220	220	220	220	220	220	220	220	220
2	Morocco	33.50	33.50	33.50	33.50	33.50	33.50	64	64	64	64	64	64	64	64	104	214	214	214	358	424
3	Tunisia	31	31	31	31	31	51	51	51	51	51	51	51	108	216	216	216	216	216	216	216
3	Algeria	0	0	0	0	0	0	0	0	0	0	0	30	34	76	76	76	76	76	76	76

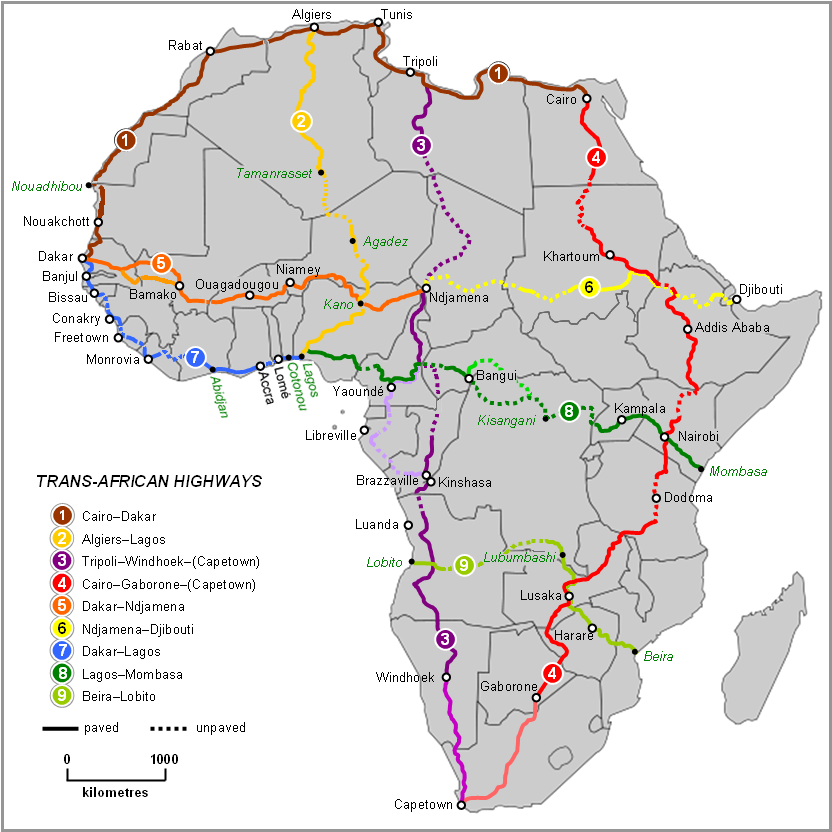
The Trans-African Highway network

Some of the portions of the Trans-African Highways are already at motorway standard.

This is a list of African countries and dependent territories sorted by motorways' total length, which is sorted by kilometers built in the 21st century.

Rank	Country (or dependent territory)	2001	2002	2003	2004	2005	2006	2007	2008	2009	2010	2011	2012	2013	2014	2015
1	South Africa	-	-	-	-	-	-	-	1600	-	-	-	-	1927	2160	2160
2	Morocco	481	496	496	539	604	632	632	794	876	1080	1420	1420	1515	1626	1783
3	Nigeria	-	-	-	-	-	-	-	-	-	-	-	-	-	-	1489
4	Algeria	76	106	135	255	645	925	965	1097	1110	1155	1185	1216	1300	1390	1394
5	Egypt	220	293	328	355	605	635	816	816	821	838	901	901	931	988	1111
6	Tunisia	216	262	267	267	323	333	333	357	357	363	363	363	363	363	363
7	Ivory Coast													230	230	230
8	Equatorial Guinea															178
9	Réunion (France)															115
10	Ethiopia															107
11	Mauritius												70	70	75	100
12	Angola															57
13	Eswatini															55
14	Zimbabwe															29
15	Namibia															27
16	Senegal															25.5
17	Libya															24
18	Gabon															20
19	Mauritania															18.5
20	Benin															16
21	Ghana															13
22	Burundi															0
23	Burkina Faso															0
24	Botswana															0
25	Central African Republic															0
26	Chad															0
27	Cameroon															0
28	Democratic Republic of the Congo															0
29	Comoros															0
30	Republic of the Congo															0
31	Cape Verde															0
32	Djibouti															0
33	Eritrea															0
34	Gambia															0
35	Guinea															0
36	Guinea-Bissau															0
37	Kenya															0
38	Lesotho															0
39	Liberia															0
40	Madagascar															0
41	Malawi															0
42	Mali															0
43	Mayotte (France)															0
44	Mozambique															0
45	Niger															0
46	Rwanda															0
47	Western Sahara															0
48	Sierra Leone															0
49	Somalia															0
50	South Sudan															0
51	Sudan															0
52	São Tomé and Príncipe															0
53	Seychelles															0
54	Saint Helena, Ascension and Tristan da Cunha (UK)															0
55	Tanzania															0
56	Togo															0
57	Uganda															0
58	Zambia															0
	Total															

== See also ==
- List of African countries by population
- Trans-African Highway network
- List of Arab countries by population
- Highway systems by country
- List of member states of the Commonwealth of Nations by population
- Road signs in South Africa
- List of Middle East countries by population
