= Turbo, Kenya =

Coordinates: 0°38′02″N 35°02′53″E

Turbo is a town at the border of Uasin Gishu County and Kakamega County Kenya, approximately 34 kilometers northwest of Eldoret city (the capital of Uasin Gishu County), along the Nairobi-Malaba Road. Turbo Constituency derives its name from the town.

In 2009 it had a population of over 35,000 people.
