= Nairobi–Nakuru–Mau Summit Highway =

Kenyan road

Coordinates: 00°12′17″S 35°50′48″E

A8 Road
- Nairobi-Mau Summit Highway

Route information
- Part of Lagos–Mombasa Highway (TAH 8)
- Length: 151 mi (243 km)
- History: Designated in 2019; Currently under construction. Completion expected in 2027

Major junctions
- Southeast end: Nairobi
- Naivasha; Nakuru
- Northwest end: Mau Summit

Location
- Country: Kenya

Highway system
- Northern Corridor

The Nairobi–Nakuru–Mau Summit Highway is a section of the A8 Mombasa-Malaba Road in Kenya. The A8 forms the Kenyan section of the Trans-African Highway 8 - Lagos–Mombasa.

The road connects the capital city of Nairobi, in Nairobi County, with the towns of Naivasha, Nakuru and Mau Summit, in Nakuru County.

== Location ==
The road starts at the township of Rironi, in Kiambu County, about 40 kilometres (25 mi), northwest of the central business district of Nairobi. The road runs in a general north-westerly direction, through Naivasha and Nakuru, in Nakuru County, to end at Mau Summit, approximately 181 kilometres (112 mi) away.

The project also involves the resurfacing of the Rironi–Mai Mahiu–Naivasha Road, also referred to as the Escarpment Road. This road measures approximately 62 kilometres (39 mi), in length. This brings the total project mileage to about 151 miles (243 km).

== Overview ==
This road is part of the Northern Corridor, used in the transportation of goods and passengers from the port city of Mombasa and the capital city of Nairobi, to Kenya's western counties and the land-locked countries of Uganda, South Sudan, Rwanda, Burundi and the eastern parts of the Democratic Republic of the Congo. It is also part of the Trans-African Highway 8 Lagos-Mombasa,

The Nairobi–Nakuru–Mau Summit Highway, has also been identified by the National Transportation and Safety Authority of Kenya (NTSA), to contain the two most accident-prone stretches of road in Kenya. These are (a) the highway between Nairobi and Nakuru and (b) the section of road Sobea–Salgaa–Mau Summit, on the road between Nakuru and Eldoret, known as the Salgaa stretch.

== Upgrading to dual carriageway ==
=== Vinci Proposal ===
In 2017, the government of Kenya, through the Kenya National Highway Authority (KeNHA) announced the planned expansion of the highway from two to four lanes, with toll stations, under a public-private-partnership arrangement.

Of the ten firms that expressed initial interest, only two consortia submitted written bids:

(a) The consortium comprising Aiim, Egis, Mota-Engil and Orascom and

(b) The Rift Valley Connect Consortium comprising Vinci Highways SAS, Meridiam Infrastructure Africa Fund, and Vinci Concessions SAS.

In October 2020, the Rift Valley Connect Consortium was awarded the contract to design, finance, build, operate, maintain the four-lane toll-highway for 30 years after commissioning, and then transfer it to the government of Kenya. The budgeted construction cost was KSh180 billion (US$1.8 billion).

=== Switch to a Chinese consortium ===
In late 2024, the Kenyan government abandoned the initial plan, and switched to using a Chinese consortium formed of China Road and Bridge Corporation (CRBC) and Shandong High-Speed Group with NSSF as a equity partner. The revised project is budgeted at 112 Billion KSH ($863million USD) with a concession period of 28 years.

The project was split between the two contractors, with CRBC working on Rironi-Gigil stretch including the lower escarpment road via Mai Maihu, and Shandong High Speed Group constructing the segment from Gilgil to Mau Summit.

The project broke ground in November 2025, with an initially projected completion date of June 2027. In October 2026, president William Ruto announced that the target completion date had been brought forward by two months, to April 2027

=== Continuation into Mau Summit-Malaba Expressway ===
The highway is envisaged to continue directly into the planned Mau Summit-Malaba Expressway, with construction scheduled to start in June 2027. Feasibility studies began in July 2026.

== See also ==
- East African Community
- List of roads in Kenya
