= SADC Regional Trunk Road Network =

Transnational roads project in Africa

Southern African Development Community Regional Trunk Road Network

System information
- Formed: August 2012; 12 years ago

Highway names

The Southern African Development Community Regional Trunk Road Network or SADC RTRN is a trans nation road network across Southern Africa. The projects in Africa being developed by the United Nations Economic Commission for Africa (UNECA), the African Development Bank (ADB), and the African Union in conjunction with the Southern African Development Community. They aim to promote trade and alleviate poverty in Africa through highway infrastructure development and the management of road-based trade corridors.

== Background ==
The Southern African Development Community Regional Trunk Road Network (SADC RTRN) is a system of numbered roads in Southern Africa. The core of the network is the reference roads, which are major trans-regional routes. East-west oriented reference roads have a two-digit number with the second digit a 0. North-south oriented reference roads have a two-digit number with the second digit a 5. Intermediate roads connect two reference roads and also have two-digit numbers. Branch, link and connecting roads are less important routes, and are identified with a three-digit number.

== Table of roads ==
The Southern African Development Community Regional Trunk Road Network (SADC RTRN) is a system of numbered roads in Southern Africa. The core of the network is the reference roads, which are major trans-regional routes. East-west oriented reference roads have a two-digit number with the second digit a 0. North-south oriented reference roads have a two-digit number with the second digit a 5. Intermediate roads connect two reference roads and also have two-digit numbers. Branch, link and connecting roads are less important routes, and are identified with a three-digit number.

=== Reference roads ===
==== East–west ====
No.	Country	Route	Constituent roads
10	DRC	Bangassou – Buta – Kisangani – Bukavu	RN4, RN3
10	Rwanda	Bukavu – Kigali – Rusumo	
10	Tanzania	Rusumo – Nzega – Dodoma – Morogoro – Dar es Salaam	T3, T1
20	Angola	Lobito – Kuito – Luena – Lucusse – Lumbala – Chavuma	
20	Zambia	Chavuma – Zambezi – Lusaka – Katete – Chipata – Mwami	D239, M8, M9, T4
20	Malawi	Mwami – Lilongwe – Liwonde – Mandimba	M12, M1, M8, M3
20	Mozambique	Mandimba – Cuamba – Nampula	
30	Angola	Namibe – Lubango – Menongue – Longa – Dirico – Mucusso	
30	Namibia	Mucusso – Divundu – Mohembo	
30	Botswana	Mohembo – Kaokwe – Gumare – Maun – Nata – Francistown – Ramokgebwana	A35, A3, A1
30	Zimbabwe	Ramokgebwana – Plumtree – Bulawayo – Gweru – Harare – Macheke – Nyazura – Mutare – Machipanda	A7, A5, A3
30	Mozambique	Machipanda – Beira	EN6
40	Namibia	Walvis Bay – Swakopmund – Karibib – Okahandja – Windhoek – Gobabis – Buitepos/Mamuno	B2, B1, B6
40	Botswana	Buitepos/Mamuno – Takatshwane – Kang – Sekoma – Kanye – Lobatse – Pioneer Gate	A2
40	South Africa	Pioneer Gate – Rustenburg – Pretoria – Middelburg – Nelspruit – Komatipoort	N4
40	Mozambique	Komatipoort – Maputo	EN4
50	Namibia	Luderitz – Keetmanshoop – Grunau – Karasburg – Nakop	B4, B1, B3
50	South Africa	Nakop – Upington – Kimberley – Bloemfontein – Maseru	N10, N8
50	Lesotho	Maseru – Thaba Tseko – Taung	A2, A5, A3

==== North–south ====
No.	Country	Route	Constituent roads
05	DRC	Bukavu – Kabinda – Mbuji-Mayi – Tshilenge – Kananga – Kenge – Madimba – Luvo	RN2, RN1, RN15
05	Angola	Luvo – M'banza Congo – N'zeto – Luanda – Maria Teresa – Huambo – Cacula – Lubango – Ondjiva – Oshikango	EN120, EN100, EN230, EN354, EN280, EN105
05	Namibia	Oshikango – Ondangwa – Tsumeb – Otavi – Otjiwarongo – Okahandja – Windhoek – Rehoboth – Mariental – Keetmanshoop – Grunau – Vioolsdrif	B1
05	South Africa	Vioolsdrif – Springbok – Clanwilliam – Malmesbury – Cape Town	N7
15	Tanzania	Mutukula – Bukoba – Kasulu – Tunduma	T4, T3, T9
15	Zambia	Nakonde – Mpika – Kapiri Mposhi – Kabwe – Lusaka – Kafue – Livingstone	T2, T1
15	Zimbabwe	Victoria Falls – Kazungula	
15	Botswana	Kazungula – Pandamatenga – Nata – Francistown – Palapye – Mahalapye – Gaborone – Lobatse – Ramatlabama	A33, A3, A1
15	South Africa	Ramatlabama – Vryburg – Kimberley – Three Sisters	N18, N12
25	Tanzania	Namanga – Arusha – Dodoma – Iringa – Uyole – Kasumulu	T2, T5, T1, T10
25	Malawi	Kasumulu – Mzuzu – Kasungu – Lilongwe – Liwonde – Liwonde – Zomba – Limbe – Blantyre – Zóbue	M8, M1, M3, M1, M6
25	Mozambique	Zóbue – Tete – Changara – Nyamapanda	N7, N8
25	Zimbabwe	Nyamapanda – Harare – Chivhu – Mvuma – Masvingo – Rutenga – Beitbridge	A2, A4, A6
25	South Africa	Beitbridge – Pietersburg – Pretoria – Johannesburg – Bloemfontein – Colesberg – Middelburg (EC) – Port Elizabeth	N1, N9, N10, N2
35	Tanzania	Lunga Lunga – Tanga – Segera – Dar es Salaam – Lindi – Mingoyo – Masasi – Nangomba – Negomane	T13, T2, T1, T7, T6
35	Mozambique	Negomane – Nampula – Mocuba – Caia – Inchope – Macia – Maputo – Namaacha	R1251, N381, N380, N1, N4, N2
35	Swaziland	Namaacha – Simunye – Big Bend – Lavumisa	MR3, MR7, MR16, MR8
35	South Africa	Lavumisa – Richards Bay – Durban	N2

=== Intermediate roads ===
No.	Country	Route	Constituent roads
06	South Africa	Three Sisters – Beaufort West – Cape Town	N1
07	Angola	Lobito – Benguela – Cacula	EN260, EN280
12	Namibia	Oshikango – Rundu – Divundu – Katima Mulilo – Ngoma	B10, B8
12	Botswana	Ngoma – Kasane – Kazungula – Pandamatenga	A33
16	South Africa	Colesberg – Three Sisters	N1
17	Tanzania	Tunduma – Uyole	T1
19	Zambia	Nakonde – Chitipa	M14
19	Malawi	Chitipa – Karonga	M26
21	Zambia	Katete – Cassacatiza	T6
21	Mozambique	Cassacatiza – Tete	N9
22	Zambia	Kafue – Chirundu	T2
22	ZImbabwe	Chirundu – Harare	A1
24	Zimbabwe	Victoria Falls – Bulawayo	A8
26	Zimbabwe	Rutenga – Chicualacuala	
26	Mozambique	Chicualacula – Macia	N221, N101
27	Mozambique	Changara – Catandica – Nova Vanduzi	N7
28	Malawi	Blantyre – Nsanje – Marka	M1
28	Mozambique	Marka – Mutarara – Morrumbala – Mabore	N300, N322
29	Malawi	Limbe – Milange	M2
29	Mozambique	Milange – Mocuba	N11, N321
31	Tanzania	Arusha – Korogwe – Segera	T2
32	Namibia	Otjiwarongo – Karibib	C33
34	Botswana	Sehitwa – Ghanzi	A3
36	South Africa	Rustenburg – Johannesburg – Harrismith – Durban	R24, N1, N12, N3

=== Branch/link/connecting roads ===
No.	Country	Route	Constituent roads
231	South Africa	Winburg – Harrismith	N5
322	South Africa	Polokwane – Tzaneen – Nelspruit	R71, R526, R40
421	Botswana	Palapye – Groblersbrug	B140
421	South Africa	Groblersbrug – Mokopane – Middelburg (MP) – Ermelo – Oshoek	N11, N17
421	Swaziland	Oshoek – Mbabane – Manzini – Siteki – Goba	MR3, MR7
421	Mozambique	Goba – Route 35	N3
422	South Africa	Komatipoort – Mananga	R571
422	Swaziland	Managa – Mhlume – Route 35	MR5, MR24
423	Swaziland	Manzini – Big Bend	MR8
425	South Africa	Johannesburg – Ermelo – Golela	N17, N2
426	South Africa	Johannesburg – Witbank	N12
431	Mozambique	Maputo – Ponta do Ouro	N200
431	South Africa	Ponta do Ouro – Manguzi – Hluhluwe	R22
516	South Africa	Groblershoop – De Aar – Middelburg	N10

- Review of the Regional Trunk Road Network

== See also ==
- Other intercontinental highway systems: Asian Highway Network, International E-road network and Arab Mashreq International Road Network
- Trans-African Railway
