= Trans-Sahelian Highway =

Road in Africa

Trans-African Highway 5

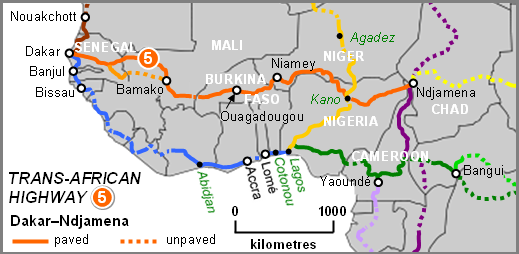

Route information
- Length: 4,496 km (2,794 mi)

Major junctions
- West end: TAH 1 and TAH 7 in Dakar, Senegal
- TAH 2 in Kano, Nigeria
- East end: TAH 3 and TAH 6 in N'Djamena, Chad

Location

Highway system
- Transport in
← TAH 4	→ TAH 6

The Trans-Sahelian Highway or TAH 5 is a transnational highway project to pave, improve and ease border formalities on a highway route through the southern fringes of the Sahel region in West Africa between Dakar, Senegal in the west and Ndjamena, Chad, in the east. Alternative names for the highway are the Dakar-Ndjamena Highway or Ndjamena-Dakar Highway and it is Trans-African Highway 5 in the Trans-African Highway network.

The highway passes through seven countries and five national capitals, and links regions of similar climate and environment which have cultural and trade links going back centuries. It is one of two east–west transnational links in West Africa and runs inland from and, for most of its length, roughly parallel to the Trans–West African Coastal Highway with a separation of about 900 km (559 mi).

As of 2026, TAH 5 is the only Trans-African Highway to be fully complete and passable.

== Route and status ==
=== Overall features, length and condition ===
The Trans-Sahelian Highway has a length of about 4,500 km (2,800 mi) running through Senegal, Mali, Burkina Faso, Niger, Nigeria, and the far northern tip of Cameroon, ending at N'Djamena just inside the western border of Chad. As of 2026, TAH 5 is the only Trans-African Highway to be fully complete and paved.

Most of the route uses existing national highways, but an optional route requires construction of a completely new road between Senegal and Mali.

=== Detail of sections ===
The cities and countries served, and status of the road are as follows (going east):

- In Senegal, Dakar to Tambacounda, 462 km (287 mi), paved, 315 km (196 mi) in poor condition; this road has been paved for several decades.
- Linking Senegal and Mali between Tambacounda and Bamako, two options were proposed in the 2005 consultants' report
1. a shorter more direct southern route via Saraya, Senegal and Kita, about 825 km (513 mi), using about 300 km (186 mi) of road paved in the 1990s of which most was in good condition, and requiring construction of 345 km (214 mi) of new road and the paving of 180 km (112 mi) of earth road;
2. and longer northern route of about 910 km (565 mi) via Kayes, Diéma, Mali and Didieni, utilising national roads of Mali which are paved.
- In south-eastern Mail, Bamako to Sikasso via Bougouni – 374 km (232 mi), paved before 1990 and in fair condition. Also from Sikasso to Koloko at the Burkina Faso border, paved and in fair condition.
- Burkina Faso section — 862 km (536 mi) via Bobo-Dioulasso, Ouagadougou, Koupéla, and Fada N'gourma, paved and in good condition;
- Niger section: 837 km (520 mi) of which 600 km (373 mi) was in poor condition, via Niamey, Dosso, Dogondoutchi, Birnin-Konni and Maradi to the Nigerian border at Jibia.
- Nigeria section — 972 km (604 mi), all paved and in fair condition, via Katsina, Kano, Kari, Maiduguri and Dikwa.
- The short Cameroon section consists of an 85 km (53 mi) unpaved gravel road from the Nigerian border to Maltam which is impassable in the wet season; as this road is not used by local traffic to any extent, Cameroon has no plans to upgrade it. The 25 km (16 mi) section from Maltam to Kousseri at the Chad border is paved and is used mainly by Chadian traffic.
- Chad: the highway is fairly complete except for the last 150 km from Abeche to the Sudanese border town of Adré and a small gap within the city limits of Mongo, Chad. It is in need of some maintenance in some areas as the surface has become broken up. There is regular bus service from the capital N'Djamena to Abeche every day.

Alternative routes at the eastern end:

- the alternative to the unpaved section through Cameroon is a route which adds about 200 km (124 mi) on paved roads via Bama, Nigeria and Mora and Waza National Park in Cameroon.
- an alternative route of about 1,400 km (870 mi) between Niger and Chad, by-passing Nigeria, will be possible when a proposed new road around the north and east of Lake Chad is built connecting Ndjamena to Nguigmi which is about 60 km (37 mi) inside Niger. Nguigmi is connected by a paved road via Zinder to Maradi, Niger where it meets the Trans-Sahelian Highway.

=== Links to other transnational highways ===
The Trans-Sahelian Highway intersects with the following Trans-African Highways:

- TAH 1 (Cairo-Dakar Highway) in Dakar
- TAH 7 (Trans–West African Coastal Highway) in Dakar
- TAH 2 (Trans-Sahara Highway) in Kano, Nigeria
- TAH 6 (N'Djamena–Djibouti Highway) in N'Djamena, with which it will form a complete east–west crossing of the continent of 8,715 km (5,415 mi).

The northern regions of Guinea, Côte d'Ivoire, Ghana, Togo, and Benin are close to the Trans-Sahelian Highway, which may be used to by travellers between those regions in preference to the Trans–West African Coastal Highway further south. Paved roads connect the Trans-Sahelian and West African Coastal Highways through

- Côte d'Ivoire (Sikassa or Bobo-Dioulasso to Yamoussoukro)
- Ghana (Ouagadougou to Accra)
- Togo (Koupela to Lomé)
- Benin (Dosso to Cotonou)
- Nigeria (Birnin-Konni or Kano to Lagos).

== See also ==
- Trans–West African Coastal Highway
- Trans-Sahara Highway
- Trans-African Highway network
