= Trans–West African Coastal Highway =

Planned highway in West Africa

Trans-African Highway 7

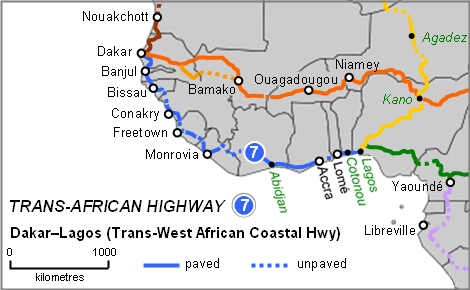

Route information
- Length: 4,010 km (2,490 mi)

Major junctions
- West end: TAH 1 and TAH 5 in Dakar, Senegal
- East end: TAH 2 and TAH 8 in Lagos, Nigeria

Location

Highway system
- Transport in
← TAH 6	→ TAH 8

The Trans–West African Coastal Highway or TAH 7 is a transnational highway project to link 12 West African coastal nations, from Mauritania in the north-west of the region to Nigeria in the east, with feeder roads already existing to two landlocked countries, Mali and Burkina Faso.

The eastern end of the highway terminates at Lagos, Nigeria. Some organizations such as the Economic Community of West African States (ECOWAS) consider its western end to be Nouakchott, Mauritania, and others such as the United Nations Economic Commission for Africa consider it to be Dakar, Senegal, giving rise to these alternative names for the road:

- Nouakchott–Lagos Highway
- Lagos–Nouakchott Highway
- Dakar–Lagos Highway
- Lagos–Dakar Highway
- Trans-African Highway 7 in the Trans-African Highway network.

== Route and status ==
=== Length and condition ===
The length of the route is 4,560 kilometres (2,833 mi) of which 83% or 3,777 km (2,347 mi) has been paved according to African Union (AU) documents, or 4,010 km (2,492 mi) with 3,260 km (2,026 mi) paved, according to African Development Bank (ADB) reports (which do not include the Nouakchott-Dakar section of about 570 km (354 mi)). There are about 9 unpaved sections, but some paved sections require reconstruction. All are two-lane highways with the exception of short four-lane highways in the eastern third of the route. The ADB reports published in 2003 say that 32% of the highway is in poor condition, 9% is good and 59% is fair. Reconstruction of the segment in Lagos, Nigeria began in 2010, and when it is complete that section will be ten lanes wide.

=== Managing authorities ===
The highway is a project of ECOWAS and the New Partnership for Africa’s Development (NEPAD) of the AU, with funding from the African Development Bank. The route is Trans Africa Highway No. 7 (TAH7) in the International Road Federation's list of nine highways which it regards as priorities for a Trans-Africa Highway network.

=== Route ===
The cities and countries served, and status of the road are as follows. Please note that a paved alternate route Dakar-Bamako-Abidjan (shown in black on map) is more practical. Information about construction required is from two sources: the ECOWAS website, undated document, and the ADB website, consultancy report date August 2003. Note: 'spur' indicates the city is on a spur off the main alignment of the highway, 'existing' could mean a pre-existing national road has been adopted for the route or a section has been newly constructed.

- Nouakchott, Mauritania – existing to:
- Dakar (spur), Senegal – existing, to:
- Banjul, Gambia – existing, some sections with pavement missing, through The Gambia then southern Senegal to:
- Bissau, Guinea-Bissau – existing to Quebo, with a short new section required to the Guinea border where a major bridge over the Kogon River was planned for construction to start in 2004;
- a new 89 km (55 mi) section in Guinea is needed from the border to Boké;
- in Guinea, Boké to Conakry (spur) and the Sierra Leone border is existing;
- in Sierra Leone reconstruction has been completed, there is a new bridge over the Moa River to Zimmi, continuing to the Liberian border;
- in Liberia, the section though Monrovia inland to Ganta is existing, with a new section required of about 70 km (43 mi), Ganta-Sanniquellie–Kahnple-Ivory Coast border;
- in Ivory Coast a new section is needed from the Liberian border through to Danané, while the road from there through Man, Yamoussoukro and Abidjan to the Ghanaian border is complete:
- in Ghana the road is existing through Cape Coast and Accra to the border with Togo, and 31 km (19 mi) east from Akatsi to Dzodze has been replaced by a new road parallel to the old;
- the 80 km (50 mi) through Togo has been replaced by a new road by-passing Lomé on the north side;
- the Benin section through Cotonou and Porto-Novo is existing to the Nigerian border:
- about 60 km (37 mi) from the border to Lagos, Nigeria is existing.

=== Notes ===
1. Between Monrovia and Abidjan the highway departs from the coastal route and goes as much as 400 km (249 mi) inland. Originally it was planned to follow the coast, and to this end Ivory Coast built a paved road west of Abidjan along its coast to Tabou, near the Liberian border. However Liberia did not build any paved highways along its coast to Monrovia, and later adopted the inland route.
2. The eastern third of the route spanning Ivory Coast, Ghana, Togo, and Benin to Lagos is the longest existing section and probably the oldest, and the most used by traffic, to the extent that it became worn out and congested, leading to the need to construct new parallel by-passes along sections in Togo and in south-eastern Ghana.
3. The longest sections of earth roads needing to be paved, or missing entirely, are in Guinea, Sierra Leone and Liberia, the last two both still recovering from years of civil war.

=== Feeder roads and other transnational highways ===
Bamako, Mali and Ouagadougou, Burkina Faso (the two landlocked countries of ECOWAS) are already linked to the coastal highway by paved highways to Abidjan, Accra and Lomé. Lagos is linked via the largest network of paved highways in West Africa, the national road network of Nigeria, with links to the neighbouring countries of Niger, Chad and Cameroon.

The Trans-Sahelian Highway is another ECOWAS project running parallel to the coastal highway linking the Sahelian countries of West Africa from Dakar to Ndjamena, Chad.

Two other transnational roads are also under development from Lagos to link to the Trans–West African Coastal Highway:

- TAH 2 (Trans-Sahara Highway) to Algiers, Algeria, most of which is already paved.
- TAH 8 (Lagos-Mombasa Highway), which still requires a long paved section through the Democratic Republic of the Congo. The Trans–West African Coastal Highway could then be regarded as the western end of a route spanning the continent from its western extremity virtually to its eastern extremity for a total distance of 10,269 km (6,381 mi).

== See also ==
- Trans-African Highway network
- Trans-Sahara Highway
- Trans-Sahelian Highway
- Cairo-Dakar Highway
