= Tripoli–Cape Town Highway =

Trans-African road

Trans-African Highway 3

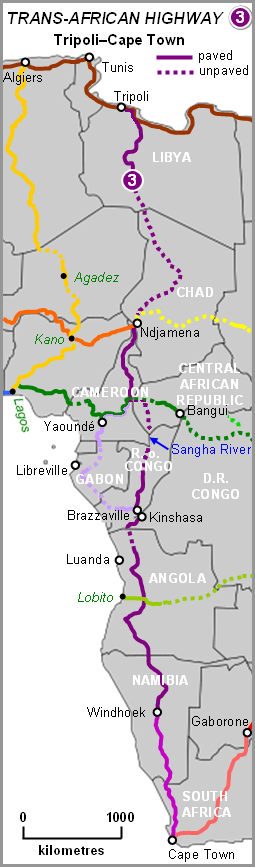

Route information
- Length: 10,808 km (6,716 mi)

Major junctions
- North end: TAH 1 in Tripoli, Libya
- TAH 5 and TAH 6 in Ndjamena, Chad; TAH 8 in Yaoundé, Cameroon; TAH 9 in Angola
- South end: TAH 4 in Cape Town, South Africa

Location

Highway system
- Transport in
← TAH 2	→ TAH 4

The Tripoli–Cape Town Highway or TAH 3 is Trans-African Highway 3 in the transcontinental road network being developed by the United Nations Economic Commission for Africa (UNECA), the African Development Bank (AfDB), and the African Union. The route is 10,808 km (6,716 mi) long, has the longest missing links, and requires the most new road construction.

South Africa was not originally included in the route, which was first planned during the Apartheid era, but it is now recognized that it would continue to Cape Town. It may still be referred to in documents as the Tripoli-Windhoek Highway because of this fact.

It is meant to be the second link between North and Southern Africa, with the Cairo-Cape Town Highway being the other route, passing through East Africa.

== Route ==
The route passes through Libya, Chad, Cameroon, the Central African Republic (CAR), the Republic of the Congo (ROC), the western tip of the Democratic Republic of the Congo (DRC), Angola, Namibia, and South Africa. Only national paved roads in Libya, Cameroon, Angola, Namibia, and South Africa can be used to any extent. Currently, only desert tracks run from southern Libya to the vicinity of Ndjamena, a distance of more than 2000 km, and no track of any kind exists between Salo, CAR, and Ouésso, ROC.

=== Northern section ===
The Tripoli–Cape Town Highway is not a high priority in its northern section across the Sahara between Tripoli and Ndjamena, where the Trans-Sahara Highway further west would probably see more use and provides an alternative north–south route. Libya is said to be more interested in road links to Niger, which would connect to the Trans-Sahara Highway. Coupled with lawlessness and the potential for instability in the Libya-Chad border regions, the northern section is likely to be the last to be developed and may be a couple of decades away from completion.

=== Central section ===
It is the central section between northern Angola and Cameroon, which is most needed because it would provide the first paved link between the West African and Southern African regions, and it would do the most to stimulate trade, which currently has to go by air or sea. The central section, however, is a 'missing link', and the planned alignment between CAR and ROC would pass through some of the most remote and difficult terrain and rainforests of the Sangha River basin. This alignment has the potential to have an enormous environmental impact on relatively untouched forests within several nature reserves.

An alternative alignment for the road has been proposed between Yaoundé, Cameroon, and Brazzaville, ROC, which would better facilitate transport between the south and west of the continent and would probably have less environmental impact. It would run via Lambaréné (Gabon) and Dolisie (ROC). This route has already been paved as far south as Ndendé, near the Congo border, meanwhile paving the rest is underway. From the south, traffic going to West Africa would branch off in Yaoundé onto the western section of the Lagos-Mombasa Highway, while traffic going east and north would share the paved road from Yaoundé to Garoua-Boulai on the Cameroon-CAR border. As well as being shorter for traffic between south and west, this alternative alignment has other advantages: it already carries a little international traffic, it runs through more populated and economically active areas, it adds Gabon (and its capital, Libreville, via a spur) to the network, and it passes very close to Equatorial Guinea (Rio Muni) and the Atlantic ports of Douala and Pointe-Noire. Furthermore, a greater proportion of this section is paved, and those sections which are gravel roads or earth tracks are important as national roads and therefore are higher priorities for paving.

Between Dolisié and Matadi, an alternative, mainly paved route is also available through Pointe-Noire and Cabinda, crossing the Congo River at the Matadi Bridge instead of by ferry between Brazzaville and Kinshasa.

=== Southern section ===
The southern section between DRC and Cape Town, on the other hand, is an important regional road within the Southern African Development Community (SADC).

The Route follows south on the N1 highway in the DRC. It enters Angola through the EN140 and follows south through to the EN120 and enters the B1 in Namibia. The route continues South and connects to South Africa via the N7 highway. The highway continues south until it interchanges with the N1 and M7 highways in Cape Town.

Paving of existing roads is required in northern Angola, but from Ngage through Angola, Namibia's B1 road and South Africa's N7 highway to Cape Town is fully paved and is in fair to good condition.

== See also ==
- Trans-African Highway network
- Lagos-Mombasa Highway

== See also ==
- African Development Bank/United Nations Economic Commission For Africa: "Review of the Implementation Status of the Trans African Highways and the Missing Links: Volume 2: Description of Corridors". August 14, 2003. Retrieved 14 July 2007.
- Michelin Motoring and Tourist Map: "Africa North and West". Michelin Travel Publications, Paris, 2000.
