= Trans-Sahara Highway =

Highway across the Sahara in Africa

Trans-African Highway 2

Route information
- Length: 4,504 km (2,799 mi)

Major junctions
- North end: TAH 1 in Algiers, Algeria
- TAH 5, in Kano, Nigeria
- South end: TAH 7 and TAH 8 in Lagos, Nigeria

Location

Highway system
- Transport in
| ← TAH 1 | → TAH 3 |

The Trans-Sahara Highway or TAH 2, formally the Trans-Saharan Road Corridor (TSR), and also known as the African Unity Road, is a transnational infrastructure project to facilitate trade, transportation, and regional integration among six African countries: Algeria, Chad, Mali, Niger, Nigeria, and Tunisia. It runs roughly 4,500 km (3,106 mi) north to south across the Sahara desert from Algiers, Algeria on the Mediterranean coast of North Africa to Lagos, Nigeria on the Atlantic coast of West Africa; subsequently, it is sometimes known as the Algiers–Lagos Highway or Lagos–Algiers Highway.

The TSR is one of the oldest and most complete transnational highways in Africa, having been proposed in 1962, with construction of sections in the Sahara starting in the 1970s. In addition to paving and widening existing roads, the corridor includes thousands of kilometres of cable as part of the "Trans-Saharan Fibre Optic Backbone", a multinational project to increase high-speed telecommunications across the region. The physical infrastructure is to be complemented by policies relaxing cross-border trade and migration and developing logistical services.

The TSR is one of nine Trans-African Highways (TAH) being developed by United Nations Economic Commission for Africa (UNECA), the African Union (AU), the Islamic Development Bank (IsDB) and the African Development Bank (AfDB) with the support of the Arab Bank for Economic Development in Africa, UNCTAD, and other regional and international organizations.

As of 2022, the majority of the highway has been completed, with the central section between Algeria and Niger still being paved.

== Status ==
=== Overall features, length and condition ===
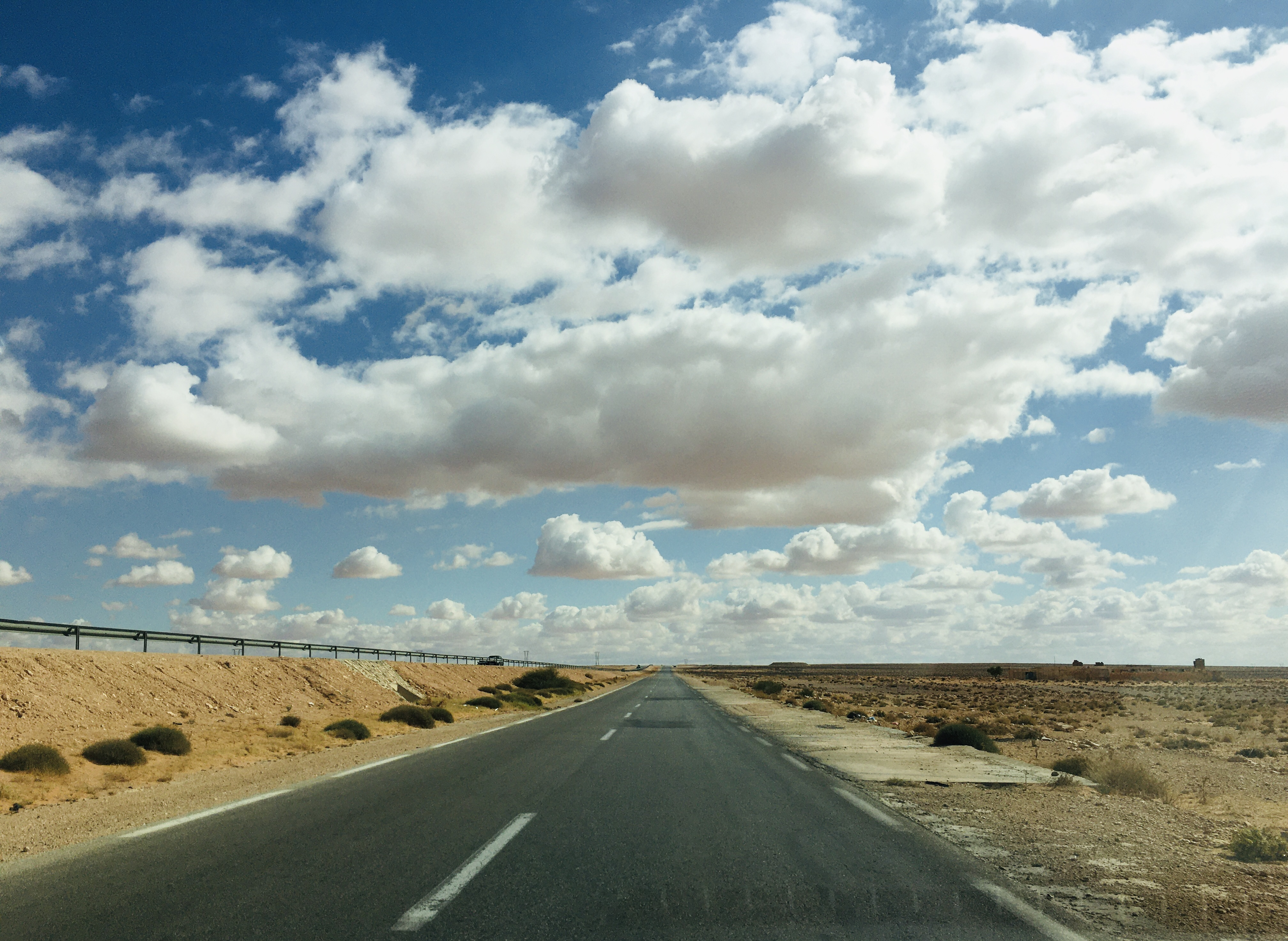
Trans-Sahara Highway between Laghouat and Ghardaia in Algeria

The Trans-Sahara Highway has a length of about 4,500 km of which about 98% has been paved. It passes through three countries: Algeria, Niger and Nigeria. However, an additional 3,600 km of linked highways to Tunisia, Mali, Chad and Mauritania are considered by planners to be integral to the Trans-Sahara Highway network. The six member countries represent 27% of the continent's GDP and 25% of its population.

The 1,200 km of the highway in Nigeria are part of that country's national paved road network and include nearly 500 km of four-lane divided sections, but highway maintenance is frequently deficient and parts of the road may be in poor condition.

About half the highway, over 2,300 km, lies in Algeria and is mostly in good condition, with the newest sections south of Tamanrasset. From the Algerian border town of In Guezzam to 'Point Zero' on the Niger border is now sealed, with a sand berm extending to either side to disrupt migrant trafficking.

Niger has 985 km of the highway and in 2023 some 900 km had been asphalted, although parts are in poor condition in the south. Further details are given below.

Another crossing of the Sahara was proposed for the Tripoli–Cape Town Highway (Trans-African Highway 3) but this route requires a great deal more construction, faces problems of instability and lawlessness in southern Libya and northern Chad, and is not likely to stimulate trade to the same extent as TAH 2. It may be decades away from completion.

Two other Trans-African Highways cross the Sahara, but at its edges. In 2005 the Cairo–Dakar Highway (TAH 1) in the west along the Atlantic coast became the first fully sealed highway crossing the Sahara from north to south (barring a few kilometres in No Man's Land between Morocco/Western Sahara and Mauritania). The Cairo–Cape Town Highway (TAH 4) follows the Nile in the east, the previous long unpaved sections in Sudan, Ethiopia and Kenya have since been significantly improved. The highway from Nanyuki in Kenya to Moyale at the Ethiopian border is an excellent tarmac road. The roads in Ethiopia and Sudan are all tarmac of good quality as of October 2020.

Announced in 2018, by 2019 a third trade route opened between Algeria and Mauritania, and following pandemic delays, in 2024 opened officially to non-freight traffic, but has yet to be classified. Established during the French colonial era as a link between Algiers with Dakar to avoid what was then the Spanish Sahara on the Atlantic, it was closed in 1963. Currently the tarmac ends at Hassi Abdelah, the Mauritanian frontier post 75km south of Tindouf. It resumes some 790 kilometres later near Zouerat, passing through Ain Ben Tili and Bir Moghrein.

== Route ==
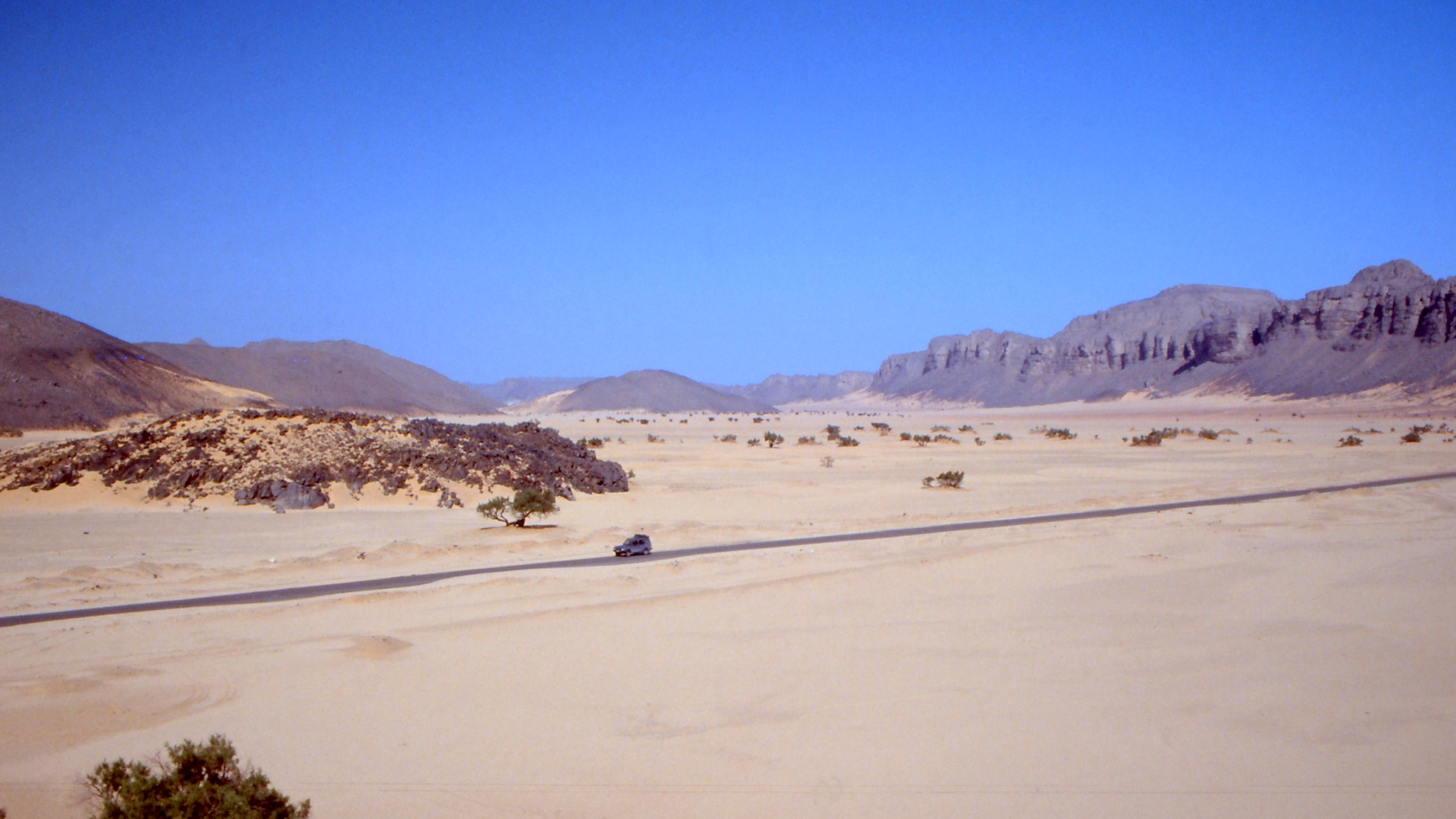
Roadway in the Algerian Sahara

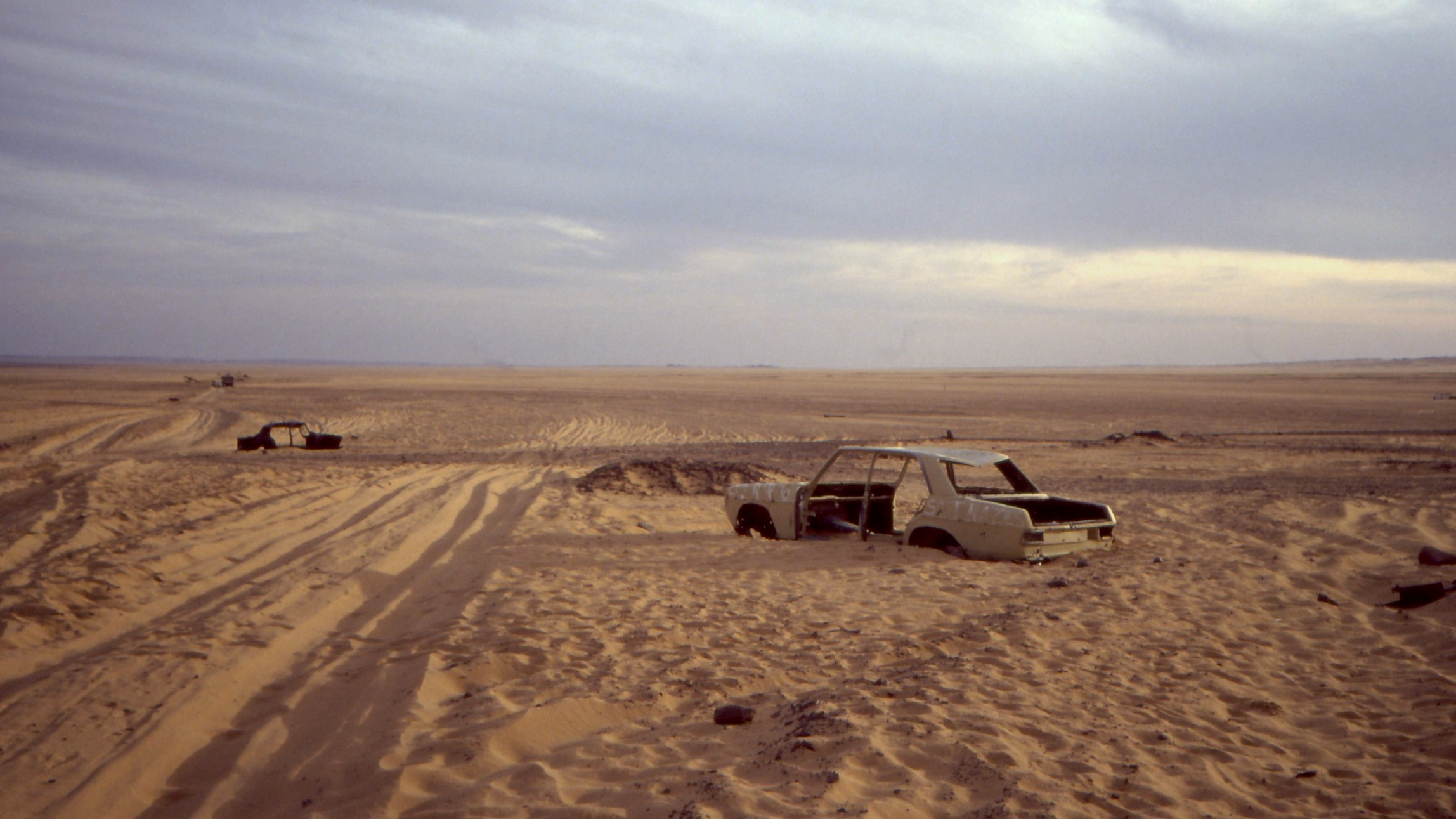
Tracks and abandoned vehicles near the border to Niger

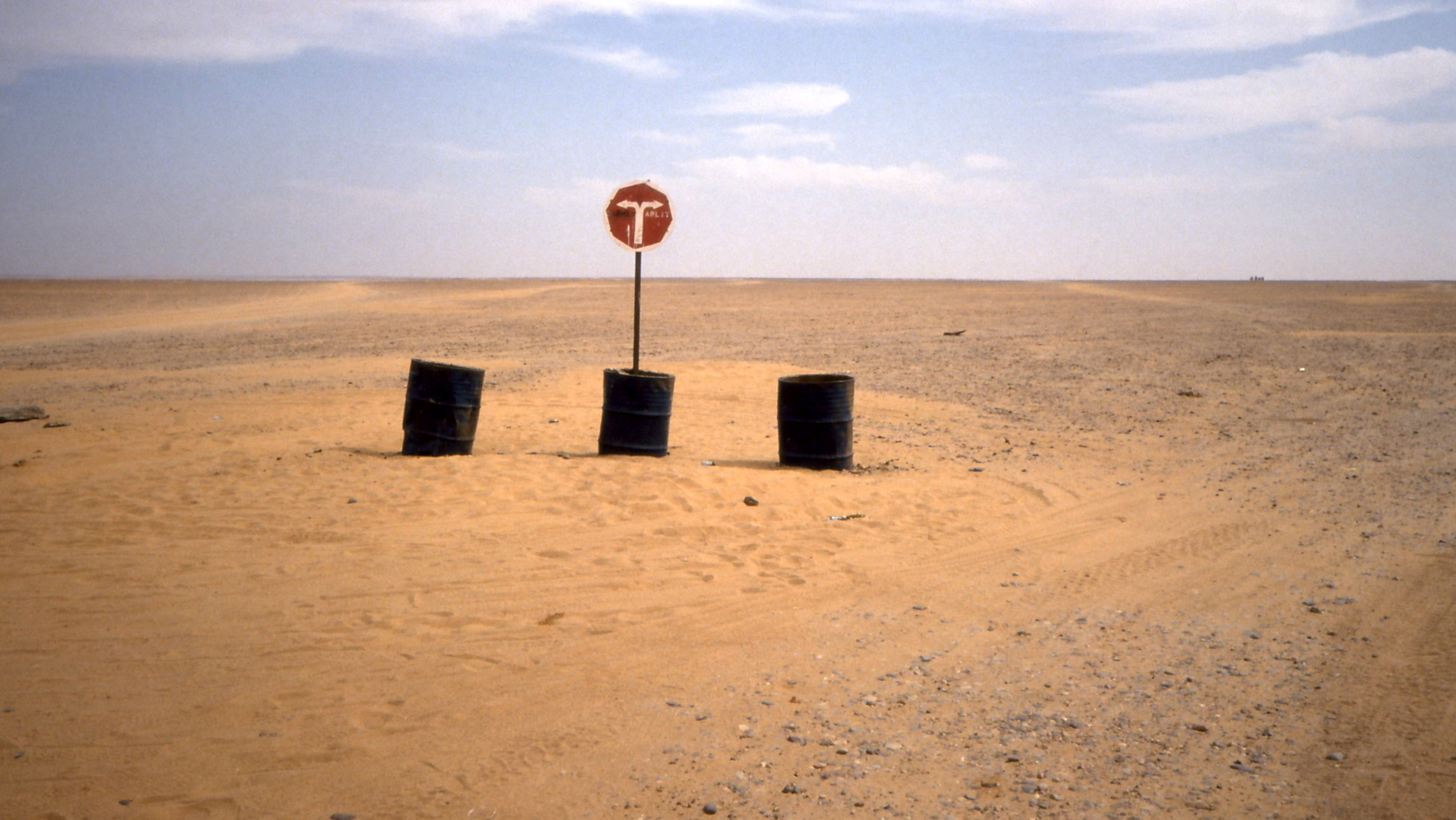
Road sign in Niger

The cities and countries served, and status of the road are as follows.

=== In Algeria ===
- Algiers to Ghardaia, 625 km, paved, in good condition
- Ghardaia to Tamanrasset, 1,291 km, paved in good condition
- Tamanrasset to In Guezzam at the Niger border, 400 km, paved.
- In Guezzam to Assamaka, the Niger border post: 28 km sealed to 'Point Zero', thereafter soft sand tracks, possible in high clearance vehicles.

See also: Algeria–Niger border

=== In Niger ===
- Assamaka to Arlit, 210 km. In 2023 less than 100 km of marked track remain, followed by new tarmac southeast to Arlit
- Arlit to Agadez, 243 km, paved in 1980 and probably recently repaved. The OPEC Fund said March 19, 2021 that the final stretch of road was "soon to be completed."
- Agadez to Zinder, 431 km, paved.
- Zinder-Magaria at the Nigerian border, 111 km, paved but in poor condition.

See also: Niger-Nigeria border

=== In Nigeria ===
- Niger border to Lagos via Kano, Kaduna, Oyo, Ibadan: 1,193 km of which 127 km is in good condition and 1,066 km 'fair'.

In summary, although ageing paved sections will always deteriorate and require maintenance, currently less than 100 km of the route east of Assamaka remains a marked sandy track. The Trans-Sahara Highway via the central Sahara may well soon be sealed.

== Links to other transnational highways ==
The Trans-Sahara Highway intersects with:

- Cairo–Dakar Trans-African Highway in Algiers
- Trans-Sahelian Highway in Kano, Nigeria
- Trans–West African Coastal Highway in Lagos
- Lagos–Mombasa Highway in Lagos

== See also ==
- Missions Berliet-Ténéré
- Trans–West African Coastal Highway
- Trans-Sahelian Highway
- Trans-African Highway network
- Transport in Niger
- History of Algeria (1962–1999)
- Civil War and Bouteflika
- Independence of Niger

== Sources ==
- "Sahara Overland; Trans Sahara Routes".. Retrieved 27 January 2025.
- African Development Bank/United Nations Economic Commission For Africa: "Review of the Implementation Status of the Trans African Highways and the Missing Links: Volume 2: Description of Corridors". August 14, 2003. Retrieved 14 July 2007.
