= Karnplay City =

City in Nimba County, Liberia

Coordinates: 7°16′15″N 8°30′15″W

Karnplay City (also spelled Kahnple) is one of the five cities in Nimba County, Liberia. It is located about 12 miles (19.3 km) from the Ivorian border. According to the 2008 census, released by the Liberia Institute of Statistics and Geo-Information Services (LISGIS), Karnplay is the 4th largest city in Nimba, with a population of 5,585 inhabitants.
