= Mau Summit =

Kenyan town

- Location in Kenya; Placement on map is approximate
- Coordinates: 00°09′41″S 35°41′12″E
- Country: Kenya
- County: Kericho County
- Elevation: 8,314 ft (2,534 m)

Mau Summit is a town in the Nakuru County of Kenya. At Google Maps, Mau Summit sits adjacent to Londiani in Kericho County.

== Location ==
Mau Summit is located at the junction of the Kisumu-Ahero-Kericho-Mau Summit Road (B1) and the Nakuru-Eldoret Road (A104). This is approximately 50 kilometres (31 mi), by road, northeast of Kericho, where the county headquarters are located. Mau Summit is approximately 62 kilometres (39 mi), northwest of Nakuru, the nearest large city, located in Nakuru County. This is approximately 114 kilometres (71 mi), south-east of the city of Eldoret in Uasin Gishu County, along the A104 Highway. The geographical coordinates of Mau Summit, Nakuru County, are 0°09'41.0"S, 35°41'12.0"E (Latitude:-0.161389; Latitude:35.686667). The town sits at an average elevation of 2,534 metres above sea level.

== Overview ==
Mau Summit is a growing town with several primary schools, a secondary school and several motels. One of the major infrastructure developments in the town is the interchange between the Kisumu-Ahero-Kericho-Mau Summit Road (B1) and the Nairobi-Malaba Road (A104).

The town is an important transit point on the Northern Corridor as several transport routes along the corridor converge here. The Nairobi–Nakuru–Mau Summit Highway terminates in this town, while the planned Mau Summit-Malaba Expessway originates in it.

== See also ==
- Kenya Standard Gauge Railway
- List of roads in Kenya
