= I-n-Azaoua =

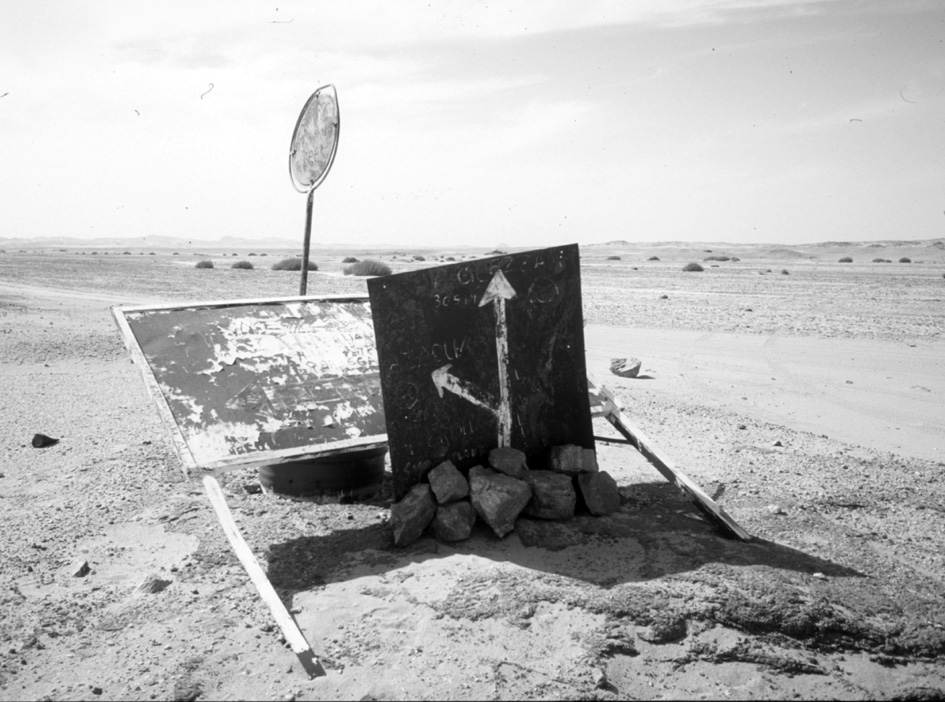
- Important old sign 95km south of Tamanrasset on the main southbound In Guezzam route, indicating the fork heading ESE for I-n Azaoua well.

- Location in Niger
- Coordinates: 20°48′30″N 7°27′30″E
- Country: Niger
- Region: Agadez Region
- Department: Arlit Department
- Elevation: 1,670 ft (510 m)
- Time zone: UTC+1 (WAT)

I-n-Azaoua was a crude, French colonial-era redoubt built in February 1899 alongside an established well, three kilometres south of the current border line between Algeria and Niger.

== History ==
During the French colonisation of north and west Africa, the Foureau–Lamy Mission of 1898-1900 constructed a small redoubt 800 metres from the well. The 1972 Institut géographique national NG-32-II map indicates water at a depth of 6 metres. Once the easier trans-Sahara crossing via In Guezzam was established in the 1960s, this remote 720-km track between Tamanrasset and Iferouane in Niger's northern Aïr Mountains became even less frequently used. As tourism grew in the 1970s, the remote Algerian part of the route to I-n Azaoua was closed by Algerian authorities and an important sign was erected 95 km south of Tamanrasset on the main In Guezzam route at the fork leading ESE for I-n Azaoua. Until that time, some travellers had mistakenly taken the I-n Azaoua route and perished.
