= TransAfricaRail =

Network mapping of rail-line

TransAfricaRail is a proposal dated 2009 to use raw materials of African countries to build a railway network from Sudan in the east to Cameroon in the west. The line would go via landlocked and rail-less Central African Republic.

== Similar projects ==
- AfricaRail
- West Africa Regional Rail Integration
- East African Railway Master Plan
- North-South Corridor Project
- Transcontinental railroad

== Djibouti-Sudan-CAR-Cameroon ==
The following proposal is a bit older and somewhat similar.

2006

- 150 km/h CONTAINER TRAINS FOR AFRICA – At the inauguration of his second term, President Ismael Omer Guelle of Djibouti appealed for a 6,000 km landbridge rail line linking his country's Gulf of Tadjourah to Cameroon on the Gulf of Guinea. Estimated to cost $US6 billion, the line would run through the Sudan and the Central Africa Republic. Neighbouring landlocked countries such as southern Sudan, Uganda, Rwanda, and Burundi would all benefit from improved facilities for import and export traffic, as well as Chad. Pointing out that the trade development, peace and economy of the African continent could be considerably enhanced, Guelle suggested that the project forms part of the investment programme proposed by British Prime Minister Tony Blair during the G8 meeting in Scotland.

"It will take only 48 hours to transport goods between the Red Sea and the Atlantic Ocean using a double-stack container carrying express train at an average speed of 150 km/h".

== Trans Africa Rail ==
- Sudan – Cameroon (2009)

== TAZARA ==
A similar project is the TAZARA Railway which links Dar es Salaam, Tanzania, to the railway network of Zambia. This was completed in 1975 with financing from the People's Republic of China.

- Dar es Salaam – Zambia
