= Malaba, Kenya =

- Location in Kenya
- Coordinates: 0°38′07″N 34°16′31″E
- Country: Kenya
- County: Busia County
- Elevation: 3,870 ft (1,180 m)

Population (2023)
  - Total: 12,303

Malaba, Kenya is a town in Teso North Sub-County, Busia County, on Kenya's western border with Uganda. It sits across the Malaba River, which forms the international border from Malaba, Uganda.

== Location ==
The town is located on the main Nairobi-Kampala highway, approximately 129 kilometres (80 mi), by road, west of Eldoret, the nearest large city. This is about 438 kilometres (272 mi) northwest of Nairobi, the capital and largest city in Kenya. The coordinates of Malaba, Kenya are: 0°38'07.0"N, 34°16'31.0"E (Latitude:0.635278; Longitude:34.275278). The town sits at an altitude of 3,871 feet (1,180 m), above sea level.

== Overview ==
The town sits on the main Bujumbura-Mombasa Road, also known as the Northern Corridor, which connects the capitals of four East African Community countries of Burundi, Rwanda, Uganda and Kenya to the Indian Ocean port of Mombasa.

A metre gauge railway, operated by Rift Valley Railways crosses the border in this town. The standard gauge railway from Mombasa is expected to pass through this town.

Malaba and Busia, both border towns between Uganda and Kenya, are used by thousands of truck drivers every day. Many of these drivers spend from a few hours to several days at the border while the trucks are loaded with new goods or while customs processes are cleared. This down time is often spent in the company of commercial sex workers.

== Population ==
Since 1999 to 2023 national population census and household enumerated the population of the town at 7,302 to 12,303.

== Border crossing ==
In 2016, the construction of a one-stop-border-crossing between Malaba, Kenya and Malaba, Uganda was concluded.

== See also ==
- Railway stations in Kenya
