= Kenya National Highways Authority =

Autonomous agency for roads in Kenya

- KeNHA

Agency overview
- Formed: 2007
- Jurisdiction: Kenya
- Headquarters: Barabara Plaza, Off Airport South Road, along Mazao Road, Opposite KCAA HQs. 1°17′57″S 36°48′48″E
- Agency executives: Winfrida Ngumi (Winnie Ngumi), Chairman; Kung'u Ndung'u, Director General
- Parent agency: Kenya Ministry of Transport And Infrastructure
- Website: www.kenha.co.ke

The Kenya National Highways Authority (KeNHA) is an autonomous road agency. Its responsibility is for the management, development, rehabilitation, and maintenance of Class S, A and B roads as explained below.

== Location ==
The headquarters of KeNHA are located at Barabara Plaza, off Mombasa Road, opposite Kenya Civil Aviation Authority HQ in the neighborhood of JKIA, in Nairobi, Kenya's capital and largest city.

== Overview ==
The Government of Kenya divides the roads into several classes, including the following:

1. Class S: "A Highway that connects two or more cities and carries safely a large volume of traffic at the highest speed of operation".
2. Class A: "A Highway that forms a strategic route and corridor connecting international boundaries at identified immigration entry and exit points and international terminals such as international air or sea ports".
3. Class B: "A Highway that forms an important national route linking national trading or economic hubs, County Headquarters and other nationally important centers to each other and to the National Capital or to Class A roads".

The agency is mandated to manage, develop, rehabilitate and maintain national roads.

== See also ==
- List of roads in Kenya
