= 2019 Kenya Population and Housing Census =

6th decinnial census in Kenya

- 24–31 August 2019
- Kenyan Counties by Population

General information
- Country: Kenya
- Topics: Census topics: Population size, composition, and spatial distribution; Levels of fertility, mortality and migration; Educational attainment; Household composition; Rate and pattern of urbanization; Size and deployment of labour force; Distribution of persons with disability; Housing conditions and availability of household amenities; Agricultural indicators
- Authority: KNBS
- Website: www.knbs.or.ke

Results
- Total population: 47,564,296 (▲23.19%)
- Most populous county: Nairobi (4,397,073)
- Least populous county: Lamu (143,920)
- Gender: 24,014,716 females (50.5%); 23,548,056 males (49.5%); 1,524 intersex
- Ethnicity: 17.13% Kikuyu; 14.35% Luhya; 13.37% Kalenjin; 10.65% Luo; 9.81% Kamba; 5.85% Somali; 5.68% Kisii; 5.23% Mijikenda; 4.15% Meru; 13.78% others
- Religious Affiliation: 85.5% Christianity; 10.9% Islam; 1.60% Irreligion; 0.67% Traditional religions; 0.13% Hindu; 0.99% Other religions; 0.16% Unknown
- Urbanization: 68.8% (Rural); 31.2% (Urban)
- Households: 12,143,913

The 2019 Kenya Population and Housing Census (KPHC) was a national population enumeration conducted by the Kenya National Bureau of Statistics (KNBS) from 24–31 August 2019. It was Kenya's eighth population census, the sixth since independence in 1963, and the first to be conducted under the 2010 Constitution of Kenya. It was also the first census in Kenya to use mobile technology in the capture and transmission of data for both cartographic mapping and enumeration.

The 2019 census marked a shift towards digital census administration, incorporating Geographic Information Systems (GIS), GPS-enabled tablets and real-time data validation. Preparations began in 2016 with the digital mapping of the country into Enumeration Areas (EAs) helping improve geographical coverage and reduce duplicate counting. The exercise replaced traditional paper-based enumeration with electronic data collection hence modernizing census operations.

The census highlighted several demographic trends including rapid urbanization, a young population, declining fertility rate and slowing population growth. The total population was 47,564,296 , a 23.19% change from 2009 census. Approximately 31.2% of Kenyans lived in urban areas, while 75.1% were aged below 35 years. The annual population growth rate declined from 2.9% in 1999–2009 to 2.2% in 2009–2019. Average household size also decreased from 4.2 persons in 2009 to 3.9 in 2019, reflecting changing household patterns.

== Conduct and methodology ==
Preparations for the 2019 Kenya census began in 2016 with cartographic mapping followed by the development of data collection tools, a pilot census, recruitment and training of personnel, and finally public awareness campaigns. The census was conducted by the Kenya National Bureau of Statistics (KNBS) under the provisions of the Constitution of Kenya, the Statistics (Amendment) Act of 2019 and the Statistics (Census of Population) Order of 2018.

The enumeration was conducted from the night of 24/25 August to 31 August 2019 followed by a mop up exercise on 1 to 2nd September to cover people who had not been enumerated during the main census exercise. It adopted the de facto approach under which people were counted according to where they spent the census reference night. Trained enumerators visited households and collected information from their members while special arrangements also were made to enumerate people in institutions and other settings including hotels, hospitals, prisons and people in transit.

The census was Kenya's first paperless population census using mobile technology for cartographic mapping, enumeration and data transmission. Information was collected on demographic and socioeconomic characteristics ,access to information and communications technology and agricultural activitis.

The exercise was also monitored by independent observers from the international community and national statistical offices in Africa. KNBS subsequently published the results in a series of reports covering population distribution by administrative unit, age and sex, and socioeconomic characteristics.

== County ==
Population, sex distribution, households and population density by county, Kenya (2019 census)
Rank	County	Total population	Female share (%)	Male share (%)	Number of households	Density (persons/km²)
—	Kenya	47,564,296	50.49	49.51	12,143,913	82
1	Nairobi	4,397,073	50.14	49.86	1,506,888	6,247
2	Kiambu	2,417,735	50.89	49.10	795,241	952
3	Nakuru	2,162,202	50.17	49.82	616,046	288
4	Kakamega	1,867,579	51.97	48.05	433,207	619
5	Bungoma	1,670,570	51.38	48.61	358,796	552
6	Meru	1,545,714	50.33	49.67	426,360	220
7	Kilifi	1,453,787	51.57	48.43	298,472	116
8	Machakos	1,421,932	50.02	49.98	402,466	236
9	Kisii	1,266,860	52.18	47.82	308,054	957
10	Mombasa	1,208,333	49.49	50.50	378,422	5,495
11	Uasin Gishu	1,163,186	50.15	49.89	304,943	342
12	Narok	1,157,873	49.99	49.99	241,125	65
13	Kisumu	1,155,574	51.44	48.55	300,745	554
14	Kitui	1,136,187	51.67	48.32	262,942	37
15	Homa Bay	1,131,950	52.33	47.67	262,036	359
16	Kajiado	1,117,840	50.12	49.84	316,179	51
17	Migori	1,116,436	51.98	48.03	240,168	427
18	Murang'a	1,056,640	50.38	49.60	318,105	419
19	Siaya	993,183	52.50	47.49	250,698	393
20	Trans Nzoia	990,341	50.59	49.39	223,808	397
21	Makueni	987,653	50.43	49.58	244,669	121
22	Turkana	926,976	48.42	51.57	164,519	14
23	Kericho	901,777	50.03	49.99	206,036	370
24	Busia	893,681	52.33	47.70	198,152	526
25	Nandi	885,711	50.19	49.82	199,426	311
26	Bomet	875,689	50.43	49.60	187,641	349
27	Mandera	867,457	49.85	50.14	125,763	33
28	Kwale	866,820	50.95	49.04	173,176	105
29	Garissa	841,353	45.44	54.55	141,394	19
30	Wajir	781,263	46.82	53.14	127,932	14
31	Nyeri	759,164	50.68	49.30	248,050	228
32	Baringo	666,763	49.55	50.44	142,518	61
33	Nyandarua	638,289	50.63	49.36	179,686	194
34	West Pokot	621,241	50.56	49.42	116,182	68
35	Kirinyaga	610,411	50.51	49.48	204,188	413
36	Embu	608,599	50.01	49.99	182,743	216
37	Nyamira	605,576	51.96	48.04	150,669	675
38	Vihiga	590,013	51.92	48.08	143,365	1,047
39	Laikipia	518,560	49.97	50.03	149,271	55
40	Marsabit	459,785	47.03	52.97	77,495	6
41	Elgeyo/Marakwet	454,480	49.97	50.02	99,861	150
42	Tharaka-Nithi	393,177	50.69	49.28	109,860	153
43	Taita/Taveta	340,671	49.12	50.88	96,429	20
44	Tana River	315,943	49.82	50.18	68,242	8
45	Samburu	310,327	49.48	50.52	65,910	15
46	Isiolo	268,002	47.94	52.06	58,072	11
47	Lamu	143,920	47.11	52.87	37,963	23

== Statistics ==
General Statistics
Category	Value
Total enumerated population	47,564,296
Male population	23,548,056
Female population	24,014,716
Intersex population	1,524
Number of households	12,143,913
Average household size	3.9
Economically active population aged 5 and above	22.3 million
Working population aged 5 and above	19.7 million
Population seeking work	2.6 million
Population outside the labour force	18.9 million
Youth aged 18–34 in the labour force	10.1 million
Youth aged 15–24 in the labour force	4.1 million
Households owning their main dwelling	61.3%
Households occupying rented or provided dwellings	38.7%
Dwellings with iron-sheet roofs	80.3%
Dwellings with concrete or cement roofs	8.2%
Dwellings with mud or cow-dung walls	27.5%
Dwellings with stone walls using lime or cement	16.5%
Dwellings with concrete walls	16.3%
Dwellings with concrete or cement floors	43.7%
Dwellings with earth or sand floors	30.0%
Households relying on piped drinking water	34.2%
Households using covered pit latrines	51.2%
Households disposing of solid waste by open burning	27.1%
Households using firewood for cooking	55.1%
Households using liquefied petroleum gas for cooking	23.9%
Households using mains electricity for lighting	50.4%
Households using solar energy for lighting	19.3%

=== Religion ===
Religion by county in Kenya
County	Total population	Catholic	Protestant	Evangelical Churches	African Instituted Churches	Orthodox	Other Christian	Islam	Hindu	Traditionists	Other Religion	No religion / Atheists	Don't Know	Not Stated
KENYA	47,213,282	20.60%	33.42%	20.44%	6.97%	0.43%	3.67%	10.91%	0.13%	0.68%	0.99%	1.60%	0.16%	0.01%
Mombasa	1,190,987	14.34%	20.28%	12.76%	3.87%	0.26%	8.44%	37.85%	0.52%	0.09%	0.56%	0.94%	0.09%	0.02%
Kwale	858,748	5.08%	13.56%	9.57%	2.58%	0.08%	5.58%	60.57%	0.04%	0.83%	0.55%	1.46%	0.08%	0.01%
Kilifi	1,440,958	6.60%	26.99%	21.33%	3.82%	0.20%	8.90%	17.62%	0.04%	2.26%	1.91%	10.18%	0.14%	0.01%
Tana River	314,710	3.59%	7.27%	2.16%	1.28%	0.06%	3.54%	81.48%	0.04%	0.07%	0.14%	0.33%	0.03%	0.02%
Lamu	141,909	9.63%	15.78%	11.82%	3.94%	0.18%	5.61%	50.59%	0.03%	0.27%	0.65%	1.41%	0.05%	0.02%
Taita/Taveta	335,747	19.92%	38.21%	25.75%	4.05%	0.24%	2.85%	7.47%	0.01%	0.05%	0.45%	0.90%	0.08%	0.01%
Garissa	835,482	0.95%	0.51%	0.10%	0.09%	0.01%	0.58%	97.64%	0.06%	0.00%	0.03%	0.01%	0.02%	0.01%
Wajir	775,302	0.39%	0.17%	0.03%	0.03%	0.00%	0.29%	98.97%	0.08%	0.00%	0.01%	0.01%	0.01%	0.00%
Mandera	862,079	0.21%	0.14%	0.02%	0.01%	0.00%	0.19%	99.35%	0.06%	0.00%	0.01%	0.00%	0.00%	0.02%
Marsabit	447,150	22.27%	8.74%	1.51%	1.05%	0.03%	1.38%	48.55%	0.04%	15.51%	0.32%	0.38%	0.17%	0.04%
Isiolo	267,997	12.17%	6.93%	2.86%	0.64%	0.07%	1.38%	72.30%	0.04%	3.14%	0.08%	0.35%	0.03%	0.01%
Meru	1,535,635	20.40%	40.06%	23.82%	8.42%	0.62%	2.96%	0.82%	0.02%	0.13%	1.23%	1.37%	0.15%	0.02%
Tharaka-Nithi	391,303	27.67%	44.02%	17.90%	4.79%	0.68%	2.33%	0.19%	0.00%	0.06%	1.04%	1.14%	0.16%	0.02%
Embu	604,769	26.98%	36.62%	22.71%	8.43%	0.60%	2.06%	0.47%	0.02%	0.06%	0.81%	1.14%	0.11%	0.01%
Kitui	1,130,134	20.80%	44.31%	22.01%	5.37%	0.20%	2.73%	0.79%	0.00%	0.38%	1.09%	2.10%	0.20%	0.01%
Machakos	1,414,022	35.37%	41.19%	15.35%	3.90%	0.17%	1.69%	0.92%	0.07%	0.07%	0.49%	0.66%	0.10%	0.01%
Makueni	977,015	29.89%	49.10%	13.51%	3.74%	0.10%	1.33%	0.67%	0.01%	0.09%	0.49%	0.90%	0.15%	0.01%
Nyandarua	636,002	17.13%	30.46%	30.69%	11.15%	0.58%	5.92%	0.15%	0.01%	0.11%	1.38%	2.31%	0.09%	0.01%
Nyeri	752,695	27.95%	37.96%	19.27%	9.09%	0.63%	2.84%	0.60%	0.02%	0.08%	0.61%	0.81%	0.13%	0.00%
Kirinyaga	605,630	29.61%	39.73%	20.19%	5.63%	0.38%	2.40%	0.40%	0.03%	0.04%	0.55%	0.92%	0.12%	0.01%
Murang'a	1,053,059	24.68%	39.42%	19.70%	9.86%	0.49%	3.49%	0.35%	0.01%	0.09%	0.73%	1.09%	0.09%	0.01%
Kiambu	2,402,834	24.51%	36.74%	21.86%	7.79%	0.74%	5.01%	0.89%	0.05%	0.13%	0.81%	1.28%	0.16%	0.02%
Turkana	922,210	44.07%	28.82%	9.47%	2.44%	0.30%	1.87%	3.34%	0.01%	4.71%	0.95%	2.75%	1.22%	0.05%
West Pokot	618,867	31.15%	37.64%	13.12%	7.08%	0.40%	2.29%	0.42%	0.00%	3.17%	1.57%	2.93%	0.20%	0.02%
Samburu	307,957	57.33%	17.65%	5.96%	1.40%	0.07%	2.20%	0.93%	0.02%	9.88%	1.52%	2.41%	0.63%	0.00%
Trans Nzoia	985,333	20.64%	35.13%	30.71%	7.03%	0.37%	2.76%	1.01%	0.04%	0.16%	0.74%	1.27%	0.14%	0.01%
Uasin Gishu	1,152,671	21.74%	45.21%	19.29%	5.97%	0.31%	3.42%	1.63%	0.14%	0.10%	0.83%	1.24%	0.12%	0.01%
Elgeyo/Marakwet	453,403	51.14%	31.95%	10.22%	2.75%	0.06%	1.63%	0.25%	0.00%	0.11%	0.65%	1.15%	0.09%	0.01%
Nandi	883,634	24.55%	45.49%	17.35%	5.64%	1.69%	2.46%	0.65%	0.01%	0.07%	0.86%	1.13%	0.08%	0.01%
Baringo	662,760	18.50%	44.06%	16.84%	6.08%	0.15%	4.29%	0.79%	0.01%	3.56%	1.85%	3.58%	0.29%	0.00%
Laikipia	513,879	28.75%	29.71%	21.15%	6.86%	0.32%	5.42%	1.65%	0.04%	1.39%	1.41%	3.05%	0.24%	0.01%
Nakuru	2,142,667	16.31%	32.85%	30.23%	7.19%	0.57%	6.53%	1.19%	0.08%	0.21%	1.43%	3.16%	0.23%	0.01%
Narok	1,149,379	13.28%	36.32%	30.53%	5.02%	0.54%	6.23%	0.42%	0.02%	1.39%	1.96%	3.97%	0.32%	0.01%
Kajiado	1,107,296	18.43%	41.72%	23.54%	4.86%	0.38%	5.44%	2.42%	0.03%	0.31%	1.11%	1.36%	0.37%	0.02%
Kericho	896,863	11.06%	44.15%	29.25%	6.23%	0.33%	4.34%	0.27%	0.05%	0.15%	1.26%	2.79%	0.09%	0.02%
Bomet	873,023	14.84%	44.33%	25.84%	6.46%	0.33%	3.73%	0.11%	0.01%	0.29%	1.27%	2.68%	0.11%	0.01%
Kakamega	1,861,332	16.47%	32.16%	30.42%	11.65%	0.37%	2.50%	4.75%	0.03%	0.16%	0.94%	0.46%	0.07%	0.02%
Vihiga	587,189	3.80%	34.36%	40.98%	15.11%	0.84%	2.29%	0.99%	0.01%	0.20%	0.79%	0.57%	0.07%	0.01%
Bungoma	1,663,898	17.55%	43.02%	28.10%	5.30%	0.30%	2.44%	1.30%	0.03%	0.23%	0.92%	0.71%	0.09%	0.01%
Busia	886,856	30.03%	29.08%	27.84%	6.75%	0.35%	2.08%	1.91%	0.02%	0.13%	1.00%	0.74%	0.08%	0.01%
Siaya	989,708	22.88%	22.72%	22.80%	23.89%	0.75%	3.48%	0.50%	0.00%	0.26%	1.72%	0.87%	0.11%	0.02%
Kisumu	1,144,777	19.60%	27.90%	25.44%	18.23%	0.93%	3.83%	1.51%	0.21%	0.32%	1.39%	0.58%	0.06%	0.02%
Homa Bay	1,125,823	16.34%	38.47%	21.41%	17.84%	0.60%	2.56%	0.66%	0.01%	0.30%	1.34%	0.42%	0.03%	0.00%
Migori	1,108,950	17.20%	37.13%	25.29%	13.77%	0.72%	2.91%	0.68%	0.01%	0.24%	1.31%	0.66%	0.06%	0.01%
Kisii	1,260,509	34.06%	45.70%	14.97%	2.08%	0.20%	1.27%	0.22%	0.03%	0.04%	0.72%	0.68%	0.03%	0.01%
Nyamira	603,051	25.35%	54.17%	14.92%	2.12%	0.13%	1.70%	0.09%	0.00%	0.03%	0.89%	0.56%	0.03%	0.00%
Nairobi	4,337,080	24.02%	31.33%	20.70%	7.08%	0.53%	5.19%	7.54%	0.88%	0.16%	1.07%	1.26%	0.21%	0.03%

== Urban Centers ==
Urban centres in Kenya by total population
Rank	Urban centre	County	Total population
1	Nairobi City	Nairobi City	4,397,073
2	Mombasa	Mombasa	1,208,333
3	Nakuru	Nakuru	570,674
4	Ruiru	Kiambu	490,120
5	Eldoret	Uasin Gishu	475,716
6	Kisumu	Kisumu	397,957
7	Kikuyu	Kiambu	323,881
8	Thika	Murang'a/Kiambu	251,407
9	Naivasha	Nakuru	198,444
10	Karuri	Kiambu	194,342
11	Ongata Rongai	Kajiado	172,569
12	Garissa	Tana River/Garissa	163,399
13	Kitale	Trans Nzoia	162,174
14	Juja	Kiambu	156,041
15	Kitengela	Kajiado	154,436
16	Kiambu	Kiambu	147,870
17	Mlolongo	Machakos	136,351
18	Malindi	Kilifi	119,859
19	Mandera	Mandera	114,718
20	Kisii	Nyamira/Kisii	112,417
21	Kakamega	Kakamega	107,227
22	Ngong	Kajiado	102,323
23	Mtwapa	Kilifi	90,677
24	Wajir	Wajir	90,116
25	Lodwar	Turkana	82,970
26	Limuru	Kiambu	81,316
27	Athi River	Machakos	81,302
28	Meru	Meru	80,191
29	Nyeri	Nyeri	80,081
30	Isiolo	Isiolo	78,650
31	Ukunda	Kwale	77,686
32	Kiserian	Kajiado	76,903
33	Kilifi	Kilifi	74,270
34	Nanyuki	Nyeri/Laikipia	72,813
35	Busia	Busia	71,886
36	Migori	Migori	71,668
37	Bungoma	Bungoma	68,031
38	Narok	Narok	65,430
39	Embu	Embu	64,979
40	Machakos	Machakos	63,767
41	Githunguri	Machakos	63,319
42	El Wak	Mandera	60,732
43	Gilgil	Nakuru	60,711
44	Kimilili	Bungoma	56,050
45	Kericho	Kericho	53,804
46	Voi	Taita/Taveta	53,353
47	Wanguru	Kirinyaga	51,722
48	Habaswein	Wajir	49,599
49	Turi	Nakuru	48,356
50	Moyale	Marsabit	47,850
51	Homa Bay	Homa Bay	44,949
52	Kenol	Murang'a	44,086
53	Masalani	Garissa	43,642
54	Murang'a	Murang'a	43,314
55	Webuye	Bungoma	42,642
56	Njoro	Nakuru	42,173
57	Kapsabet	Nandi	41,997
58	Mumias	Kakamega	41,942
59	Nyahururu	Laikipia	37,650
60	Marsabit	Marsabit	36,289
61	Rhamu	Mandera	35,644
62	Siaya	Siaya	33,153
63	Mariakani	Kwale/Kilifi	31,715
64	Maralal	Samburu	31,350
65	Mairo Inya	Nyandarua	30,527
66	Kerugoya	Kirinyaga	30,045
67	Kitui	Kitui	29,062
68	Makutano	West Pokot	28,469
69	Elburgon	Nakuru	28,359
70	Watamu	Kilifi	27,857
71	Lamu	Lamu	25,385
72	Kajiado	Kajiado	24,678
73	Nyamira	Nyamira	24,483
74	Isebania	Migori	23,891
75	Karatina	Nyeri	23,552
76	Kakuma	Turkana	22,984
77	Lafey	Mandera	22,882
78	Bondo	Siaya	22,712
79	Kabarnet	Baringo	22,474
80	Chuka	Tharaka-nithi	22,388
81	Kehancha	Migori	22,194
82	Maua	Meru	22,121
83	Taveta	Taita/Taveta	22,018
84	Takaba	Mandera	21,517
85	Eldama Ravine	Baringo	21,385
86	Hola	Tana River	20,912
87	Mai Mahiu	Nakuru	20,823
88	Rongo	Migori	20,688
89	Oyugis	Homa Bay	19,947
90	Wote	Makueni	19,725
91	Emali	Makueni/Kajiado	18,325
92	Garbatula	Isiolo	17,443
93	Mbale	Vihiga	17,404
94	Mwingi	Kitui	17,025
95	Awendo	Migori	16,815
96	Kiminini	Trans Nzoia	16,560
97	Moi's Bridge	Uasin Gishu	16,355
98	Mazeras	Kwale/Kilifi	16,254
99	Malaba	Busia	15,581
100	Makindu	Makueni	15,038
101	Banisa	Mandera	14,974
102	Msambweni	Kwale	14,951
103	Namanga	Kajiado	14,922
104	Mbita	Homa Bay	14,916
105	Isinya	Kajiado	14,429
106	Bute	Wajir	14,108
107	Kawaida	Kiambu	14,038
108	Kagio	Kirinyaga	13,961
109	Bura	Tana River	13,650
110	Suneka	Kisii	13,405
111	Litein	Kericho	13,403
112	Mogotio	Nakuru/Baringo	13,366
113	Luanda	Vihiga	13,319
114	Ol Kalou	Nyandarua	13,234
115	Rumuruti	Laikipia	13,056
116	Lokichar	Turkana	12,676
117	Chavakali	Vihiga	12,674
118	Iten	Elgeyo/Marakwet	12,630
119	Makutano (kyumbi)	Machakos	12,396
120	Eldas	Wajir	12,270
121	Port Victoria	Busia	12,194
122	Vipingo	Kilifi	12,183
123	Matuu	Machakos	12,073
124	Majengo	Vihiga	11,913
125	Modogashe	Isiolo/Garissa	11,814
126	Mau Narok	Nakuru	11,806
127	Ahero	Kisumu	11,801
128	Ijara	Garissa	11,792
129	Bomet	Bomet	11,765
130	Lokichoggio	Turkana	11,626
131	Dadaab	Garissa	11,525
132	Tala	Machakos	11,446
133	Sagana	Kirinyaga	11,203
134	Kinna	Isiolo	11,175
135	Gongoni	Kilifi	10,993
136	Merti	Isiolo	10,990
137	Keroka	Nyamira/Kisii	10,881
138	Kilgoris	Narok	10,845
139	Matunda	Uasin Gishu/Kakamega	10,807
140	Githunguri	Kiambu	10,615
141	Timau	Meru	10,571
142	Loitoktok	Kajiado	10,568
143	Kainuk	Turkana	10,535
144	Subukia	Nakuru	10,344
145	Sindo	Homa Bay	10,286
146	Kangundo	Machakos	10,258
147	Kimana	Kajiado	10,116
148	Kwale	Kwale	10,063
149	Chwele	Bungoma	9,797
150	Mwatate	Taita/Taveta	9,572
151	Salgaa	Nakuru	9,447
152	Marigat	Baringo	9,395
153	Kutus	Kirinyaga	9,143
154	Sultan Hamud	Makueni/Kajiado	8,718
155	Maragua	Murang'a	8,597
156	Kibwezi	Makueni	8,143
157	Rodi Kopany	Homa Bay	8,122
158	Naro Moru	Nyeri/Laikipia	8,097
159	Nandi Hills	Nandi	8,032
160	Usenge	Siaya	7,976

== Controversies ==
The 2019 census faced criticism over the accuracy of population figures, recruitment and deployment of enumerators, and the inclusion of vulnerable groups. Following the publication of the results in November 2019, leaders in Garissa County, Wajir County and Mandera County disputed the reported populations alleging irregularities in enumeration and bias. In January 2025, the High Court in Garissa quashed the census results for 15 constituencies across the three counties and ordered a fresh census in the affected areas. The ruling was subsequently subject to appeal.

The National Gender and Equality Commission also identified concerns about the census questionnaires and enumeration procedures including the potential exclusion of special-interest groups from demographic statistics. It issued recommendations to improve data collection and inclusion of women, children, older people, people with disabilities, minorities and marginalised groups. The commission'l census observation report documented further gaps and recommendations concerning equality, inclusion and the collection of reliable demographic information.

== See also ==
- Demographics of Kenya
