= Koech =

Koech is a Kalenjin surname of Kenyan origin that may refer to:

- Benjamin Koech (20 June), A track and field champion known for going to the Olympics in 1992 in Barcelona
- Benson Koech (born 1974), Kenyan middle-distance runner is known for his achievements as a young athlete
- Bernard Kiprop Koech (born 1988), Kenyan marathon runner
- Cherono Koech, Kenyan middle-distance runner
- Duncan Koech (born 1984), Kenyan marathon runner
- Enock Koech (born 1981), Kenyan long-distance runner
- Isaiah Kiplangat Koech (born 1993), Kenyan long-distance runner who specializes in the 5000 meters
- Job Koech Kinyor (born 1990), Kenyan middle-distance runner
- John Koech (1946–2025), Kenyan politician
- John Kibet Koech (born 1995), Kenyan-born long-distance runner representing Bahrain
- Joyce Chepchumba Koech (born 1970), long-distance athlete from Kenya
- Justus Koech (born 1980), Kenyan middle-distance runner who specializes in the 800 meters
- Paul Kipsiele Koech (born 1981), a Kenyan runner who specializes in the 3000 meters steeplechase
- Paul Koech (1969–2018), Kenyan distance and marathon runner
- Peter Koech (born 1958), a former long-distance runner from Kenya, Olympic silver medallist in the 3,000 meters steeplechase
- Robert Kiprop Koech (born 1997), Kenyan long-distance runner
- Wesley Kiprotich Koech (born 1979), Kenyan middle-distance runner who specializes in the 3000 meters steeplechase
- William Koech (born 1961), retired Kenyan long-distance runner who specialized in the 10,000 metres

== See also ==
- Kech (disambiguation)
- Koch (disambiguation)
- Kipkoech, related surname meaning "son of Koech"
- Jepkoech, related surname meaning "daughter of Koech"
