= Keck (surname) =

Keck is a German surname.

== Geographical distribution ==
As of 2014, 49.6% of all known bearers of the surname Keck were residents of the United States (frequency 1:23,396), 41.2% of Germany (1:6,259), 1.8% of France (1:115,665), 1.6% of Austria (1:16,894), 1.5% of Canada (1:79,996) and 1.3% of Australia (1:60,648).

In Germany, the frequency of the surname was higher than national average (1:5,708) in the following states:

1. Baden-Württemberg (1:2,036)
2. Bavaria (1:4,104)
3. Rhineland-Palatinate (1:5,232)

== People ==
- Anthony Keck (disambiguation)
- Bobby Keck, American NASCAR driver
- Charles Keck (1875–1951), American sculptor
- David D. Keck (1903–1995), American botanist
- Dietmar Keck (born 1957), Austrian politician
- Donald Keck (born 1941), American physicist
- Fred Keck (1854–1913), American farmer and politician
- Gary Keck, American chemist
- Hermann Keck, inventor of the Keck clip
- Howard B. Keck (1913–1996), son and successor of W. M. Keck
- James M. Keck (1921–2018), United States military officer
- Jean-Christophe Keck (born 1964), French musician and editor of the critical edition of the works of Jacques Offenbach
- Jeremiah Keck (1845–1930), American politician
- Kevin Keck (born 1973), American essayist and poet
- Philip Keck (1848–1911), American judge, lawyer, and politician
- Rachelle Keck, American lawyer and academic administrator
- Rebecca J. Keck (1827–1904), American physician and patent medicine entrepreneur
- Sandra Keck (born 1967), German singer, director, actor and author.
- Stan Keck (1897–1951), American football player
- Tara Keck (born 1978), American-British neuroscientist
- Tim Keck (born 1967), American newspaper publisher
- Tinker Keck (born 1976), American sportsman
- William Myron Keck (1880–1964), American founder of Superior Oil Company, created the W. M. Keck Foundation
