= Janet Jepkemboi Sitienei =

Kenyan politician

- Occupation: politician
- Political party: United Democratic Alliance, United Republican Party

Janet Jepkemboi Sitienei is a Kenyan politician who was elected to the National Assembly in 2017 for the Jubilee Party and in 2022 for the United Democratic Alliance. In 2024 she became a Chief of the Order of the Burning Spear of Kenya in an award by President Ruto.

== Life ==
From 1979 to 1982 she attended the Turbo Girls Secondary School. She graduated in 2011 from Egerton University.

From 2007 to 2012 she was a District Agriculture Development Officer in Bungoma.

She joined the political race in 2012 and in 2013 she stood for election in the Turbo constituency and she attracted just 200 votes despite the support of the United Republican Party. She felt that the election was irregular.

In 2015 she became an adviser to Uasin Gishu County Governor Jackson Mandago and that established her as she helped him achieve his goals.

She was elected to parliament to represent the United Democratic Alliance in 2017 for the Turbo constituency and she joined the Kenya Women Parliamentary Association.

By the time of the 2022 election she had gained considerable political capital and several political parties were candidates but she chose to stand for the United Republican Party and she won.

In 2024 her contribution was recognised with an award by the President William Ruto when she was awarded the Chief of the Order of the Burning Spear of Kenya .
