= Farouk Kibet =

Kenyan political figure (born 1965)

Farouk Teigut Kibet (born March 31, 1965, in Kapkechui village, Turbo Constituency, Uasin Gishu County, Kenya) is a prominent Kenyan political figure known for his close association with Kenyan President William Ruto. Over the decades, Kibet has played a pivotal role in shaping Kenya's political landscape through strategic advisement and grassroots mobilization.

Farouk rose to national prominence following media reports of him storming Eldoret police station in an effort to protect ODM's votes during the 2007 general election presidential votes crisis.

== Early life and education ==
Kibet began his education at Chepkemel Primary School in Turbo Constituency. Information regarding his secondary and tertiary education is limited, with some sources suggesting he may not have pursued formal education beyond primary school.

== Political career ==
- Youth Leadership: In the 1990s, Kibet emerged as a youth leader within the Kenya African National Union (KANU) party, engaging in grassroots activism in the Rift Valley region.
- Councillor of Wareng: His political journey advanced in 1997 when he was nominated as the councillor of Wareng, serving until 2003.
- Personal Assistant to President William Ruto: Kibet's most notable role has been as the personal assistant and close confidant to President William Ruto. In this capacity, he has been instrumental in managing Ruto's political engagements and providing strategic counsel, significantly contributing to Ruto's political ascension.

=== Community engagement and philanthropy ===
Beyond politics, Kibet engages in community development and religious activities:

- Church Support: He has been instrumental in fundraising and establishing over 100 churches in his local area, reflecting his dedication to his faith and community development.
- Educational Initiatives: As the patron of the Great Chepsaita Cross Country Run, Kibet has elevated the event to gold label status by World Athletics. The event's theme, "Run and Educate," underscores his belief in leveraging sports for educational advancement. By offering scholarships to the first 100 finishers in each race category, he ensures that underprivileged children receive essential support for their education.
- Philanthropic Contributions: Kibet's philanthropic efforts extend to organizing free medical camps and community development projects, aiming to enhance the quality of life in his region.

== Personal life ==
Kibet maintains a private personal life. He is married and has a son, Farouk Kibet Jr.

=== Net worth ===
Farouk Kibet's net worth is estimated to be around Ksh 300 million (approximately US$2 million), primarily derived from his roles in political consultancy and various business ventures.

== Influence and recognition ==
Within the Kenya Kwanza political alliance, Kibet is often referred to as 'Sir Farouk,' highlighting the respect he commands among politicians and senior government officials. His strategic influence has positioned him as a key advisor to President Ruto, involved in high-level political negotiations and decisions. Notably, Deputy President Rigathi Gachagua has acknowledged Kibet's pivotal role, noting that even high-ranking officials seek his counsel and approval to engage with the President.

== Controversies ==
Kibet's prominence has not been without controversy. He has faced accusations of involvement in the 2007 post-election violence and the National Youth Service (NYS) scandal. However, he has not been formally charged or convicted in relation to these allegations.
