= Kick (surname) =

Kick is a German and Dutch surname and a variant of Keck. Notable people with the name include:

- Darrell Kick (1968), American politician
- Murray Kick (1940), Australian footballer
- Richard Kick (1947), German triple jumper
- Russ Kick, American writer
- Simon Kick (1603–1652), Dutch painter
