= William Chepkut =

Kenyan politician (died 2022)

William Kamuren Chirchir Chepkut (died 8 October 2022) was a Kenyan politician who served as member of the National Assembly for the Ainabkoi Constituency between 2017 and 2022. He lost his seat to Samuel Chepkonga in the 2022 Kenyan general election.

== Early years and education ==
Between 1992 and 1995 he studied at Jabalpur University in India to study Bachelor of Commerce. He furthered his education at Kenyatta University where he acquired master's of Arts in Community Development and Organization. He was a member of the Special Funds Account Committee and the Committee on Appointments in the parliament.

== Personal life and death ==
On the morning of 8 October 2022, Chepkut collapsed at his house and was rushed to Mediheal Hospital in Nairobi, where he was pronounced dead.

== Election results ==
General election 2017: Ainabkoi
Party	Candidate	Votes	%
Independent	William Kamuren Chirchir Chepkut	23,216	54.4
Jubilee	Samuel Kiprono Chepkong'a	19,140	44.8
KANU	Cherono Raymond Toroitich	190	0.4
Independent	Wycliffe Mosi	160	0.4
Majority		4,076	9.5
