= Moi's Bridge =

Town in Kenya

Coordinates: 00°53′00″N 35°07′00″E

Moi's Bridge is a small town with the third largest National Cereals and Produce Board (NCPB) in East Africa. Moi's Bridge is an electoral ward of the Soy Constituency and Uasin Gishu County. It is sometimes called the 'bread basket' of Kenya. Moi's Bridge is also a location in the Soy division of Uasin Gishu District.

== Etymology ==
The town is named for the bridge across the Nzoia River which it grew around and as a result of. It was initially named Hoey's Bridge after Cecil Hoey, the original builder of the bridge. The name later changed to Moi's Bridge after independence, named after the second president Daniel Toroitich arap Moi.

== History ==
Cecil Hoey, one of the first European residents in the Trans-Nzoia region built a bridge across the Nzoia River so as to drive his ox teams over. A small settlement grew up around the bridge and this grew into the small town that is Moi's Bridge.

== Economy ==
The major industry in the town is cereal storage. The National Cereals Board has a cereal storage depot located in the town which consists of eight large silos with a capacity of approximately 5 million tonnes of grain.

== See also ==
- Railway stations in Kenya
