= Kech District attack =

Kech District attack may refer to these attacks in Kech District, Balochistan, Pakistan during the insurgency in Balochistan:

- 2022 Kech District attack
- 2023 Kech District attack

== See also ==
- Kech (disambiguation)
