= Eldoret East Constituency =

Former Kenyan electoral constituency

Eldoret East Constituency was a former electoral constituency in Kenya. It was one of three constituencies in the former Uasin Gishu District, now Uasin Gishu County. The constituency was established for the 1988 elections.

== Electoral history ==
Elections	MP	Party	Notes
1988	Francis Tarar Lagat	KANU	One-party system.
1992	Joel Barmasai	KANU	
1997	Francis Tarar Lagat	KANU	
2002	Joseph Lagat Kipchumba	KANU	
2007	Margaret Kamar	ODM	
Eldoret East dissolved into Moiben and Ainabkoi

== Wards ==
Wards
Ward	Registered Voters	Local Authority
Ainabkoi	3,140	Wareng county
Chemng'oror	2,082	Burnt Forest town
Hospital	2,176	Eldoret municipality
Kapsoya	7,391	Eldoret municipality
Kaptagat	6,699	Wareng county
Karuna / Meibeki	7,400	Wareng county
Kimumu/Sergoit	4,356	Eldoret municipality
Kipkabus	7,290	Wareng county
Moiben	6,575	Wareng county
Olare	3,920	Burnt Forest town
Sergoit	4,608	Wareng county
Tembelio	7,852	Wareng county
Total	63,489	
*September 2005.
