= Nice Nailantei Leng'ete =

Kenyan activist against female genital mutilation (born 1991)

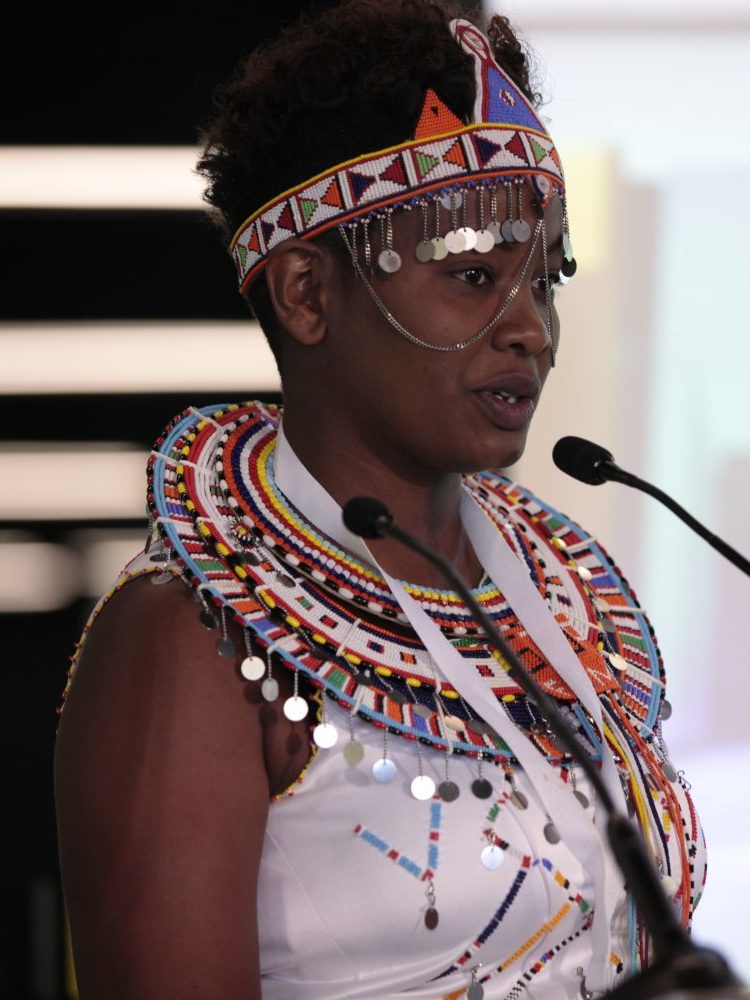
- Leng'ete in 2017
- Pronunciation: nɑɪs ‘nɑɪləntɛ lɛ̃ŋ’ɛtɛ
- Born: 1991 (age 34–35); Kimana, Kenya
- Education: Kenya Methodist University
- Occupation: Human rights activist
- Known for: Advocacy against female genital mutilation (FGM)
- Notable work: Nice Place Foundation
- Awards: Time magazine 100 world's most influential people
- Website: niceplacefoundation.org

Nice Nailantei Leng'ete (born 1991) is a Kenyan human rights activist, advocating for alternative rite of passage (ARP) for girls in Africa and campaigning to stop female genital mutilation (FGM). In her work with Amref Health Africa, Leng'ete has saved an estimated 17,000 girls from undergoing genital mutilation and for many, childhood marriages. She was named by Time magazine in 2018 as one of the 100 most influential people in the world.

== Early life and education ==
Nice Nailantei Leng'ete was born in 1991 in the village of Kimana in Maasai country, Kenya. She was orphaned when both her parents died in 1997 and 1998. She spent her early years moving among many different homes in her village. When she was eight years old, she was sent away to a boarding-school. It was there she discovered that "the cut", a rite of passage for girls transitioning to womanhood in her Maasai culture, was not required.

Growing up, I used to attend these circumcision ceremonies and I could see a lot of pain. All the girls from my own village, after they were circumcised, they had to drop out of school, and be married to old men—people who were not even of their choice. These are 10-year-old or 12-year-old girls. They're still children. They're considered women because they have undergone circumcision. But again, these are just still children. After seeing all that pain, I think that's what made me realize that this was something I didn't want to do. I knew that I would not be able to go back to boarding school [about an hour away]. I would be married, and that would just be the end of me.

At the age of eight, when her time came to undergo "the cut", Leng'ete decided to run away, encouraging her sister to come with her. They ran through the bush to their aunt's house —70 kilometers away, to avoid being seen on the road. Leng'ete's uncle and men from the village soon discovered where she and her sister were hiding. When they came for the girls, they beat and threatened them. The next year, when village girls were being prepared for the rite of passage, Leng'ete' ran away again, but was unable to persuade her sister to join her.

When she was brought back to the village, Leng'ete made an appeal to her grandfather. She told him that she would run away forever and live on the streets rather than endure being "cut". Her grandfather relented, and agreed to let her to forego the traditional ritual, and also allowed her to return to school. Leng'ete was ostracized by the village as being a bad example and someone who shamed her family and community.

== Early activism ==
Leng’ete was the first girl in her village to go to high school. She began to be seen in her village as an inspiration to young girls and women. Later, she would hide young girls who asked for her help in avoiding "being cut", an action that made her an outcast in her community. Leng'ete continued to advocate for the girls and encouraged the villagers to discuss the sensitive and important issue.

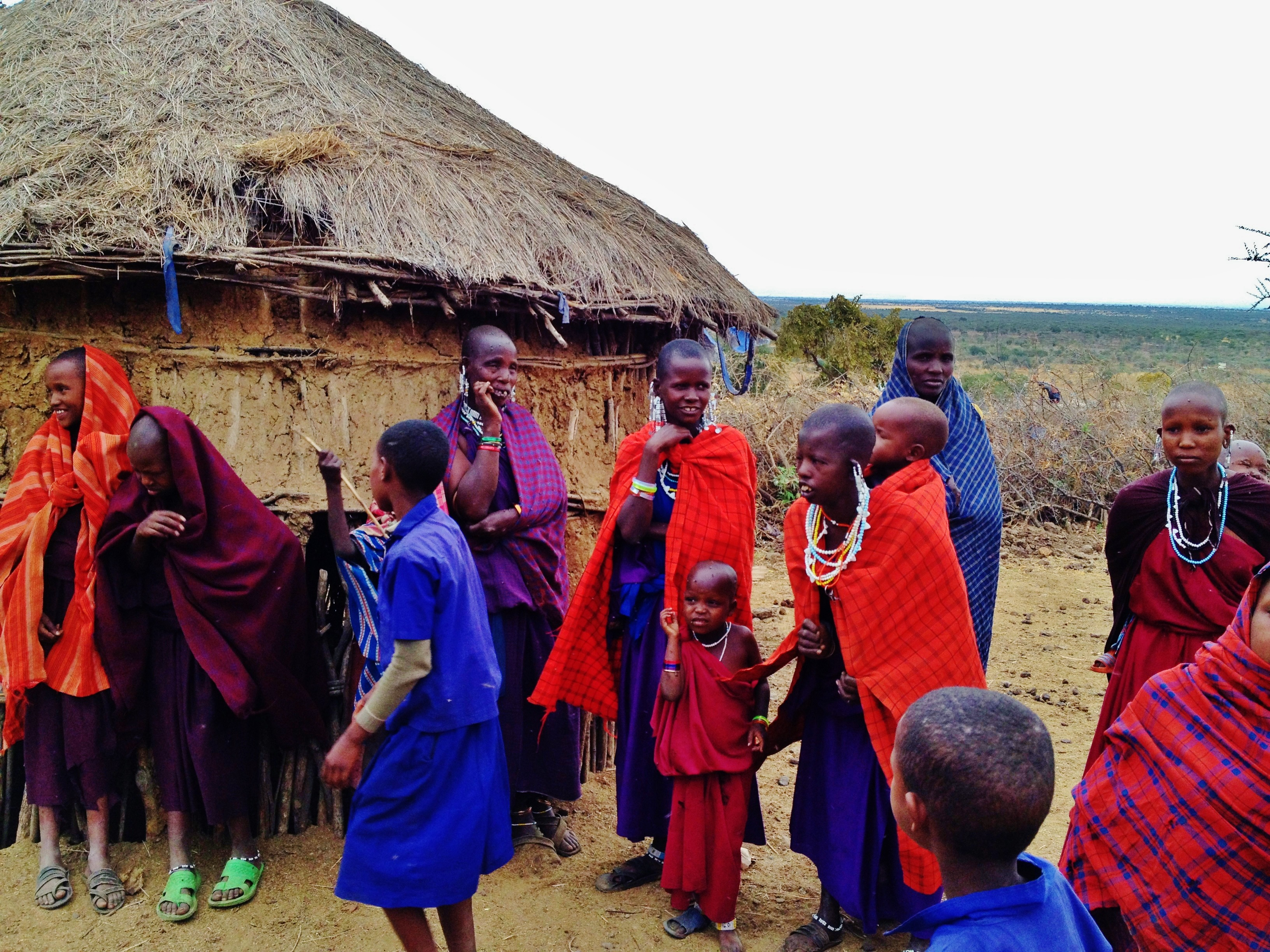
Maasai villagers, 2013

In the Maasai culture, women are not allowed to address village elders, but when Leng’ete attended a sexual health class sponsored by Amref Health Africa, she asked the village leaders to let her share with the community what she had learned. The village elders allowed her to speak only to the younger men of the village, but none of the men were interested in listening to her. "No girl had been courageous enough before to challenge the status quo, to challenge men," according to Douglas Meritei, one of those men. Len'ete would not give up, and kept trying to speak to the younger men for the next two years. Eventually, the elders of the village told the young men to sit with her, but only three of those men would speak to her. "Gradually, more of the younger men came to talk with her, she said, and gradually the topics expanded — from H.I.V. prevention to teenage pregnancy and its health complications, to early marriage, to school attrition and, finally, to the cut."

After nearly four years of conversations, the village elders decided to abandon cutting. "She had persuaded the men, and with them the village, that everyone would be healthier and wealthier if girls stayed in school, married later and gave birth without the complications cutting can create." Because of her advocacy, Leng'ete was the first woman in her village to be given the Black Walking Stick, which signifies leadership, respect and power within her community.

== Activism career ==
In 2013, Leng'ete spoke at the Clinton Global Initiative (CGI) in New York about her campaign to stop FGM. She also gave a TEDx Talk in the Netherlands on sexual and reproductive health rights.

In 2014, the Maasai elders, who rule over 1.5 million people, declared the end of the practice of FGM. Because of Leng'ete's work, girls become women in the Maasai community without undergoing FGM, continue their education, instead of marrying early and bearing children when most are still children themselves. Since 2014, Leng'ete has been working as a project officer under the Amref Health Africa in Kenya Alternative Rite of Passage project (ARP). She manages an advocacy programme that travels from village to village to convince elders and community leaders to allow other young girls to forgo "the cut" and attend school. "Leng'ete's work as a project officer with Amref Health Africa has saved an estimated 15,000 girls from FGM, as well as from childhood marriage."

Leng’ete continues work with Amref Health Africa to educate young people about sexual and reproductive health and rights. "Even though Kenya outlawed the cut in 2011 and the Maasai people abandoned it in 2014, the law is difficult to enforce, especially in rural communities. Leng’ete’s work is critical to spreading the message about FGM. “We need to reach more political leaders, more elders, more women, more men, more boys, more girls, more circumcisers,” Leng’ete says. “We need to reach more people through community dialogue and working together.”

Leng'ete has been the recipient of numerous awards since 2015 for the work she is doing to stop FGM. Time Magazine named her one of the 100 Most Influential People of 2018 for her work with Maasai communities in Kenya to end the practice of FGM.

She is the author of a memoir, The Girls in the Wild Fig Tree: How I Fought to Save Myself, My Sister, and Thousands of Girls Worldwide, published by Little, Brown And Company in 2021.

== Awards and recognition ==
- 2015: Inspirational Woman of the Year Award from the Kenyan Ministry of Devolution
- 2016: Recipient of a Mandela Washington Fellowship for Young African Leaders.
- 2018: Recognized as one of 300 global youth leaders by Women Deliver
- 2018: Awarded Annemarie Madison Prize for her commitment to stop FGM.
- 2018: Named one of Time Magazine's 100 most influential people in the world
- 2018: 100 Most Influential Young Kenyans - Avance Media
- 2022: Laureate Freedom from Want Award
