= Keck =

Keck may refer to:

- Keck (surname)
- Keck, Kentucky, an unincorporated community, United States
- 5811 Keck, an asteroid
- Keck, another name for Cow Parsley

== Science ==
- W. M. Keck Foundation, an American charitable foundation
  - W. M. Keck Observatory at the Mauna Kea in Hawaii
  - Keck School of Medicine of USC at the University of Southern California
  - Keck Graduate Institute of Applied Life Sciences in Claremont, California
  - Keck Geology Consortium, a collaboration of colleges promoting undergraduate earth science research
  - Keck Array, a microwave polarimeter at the South Pole
