= Kek =

Kek or KEK may refer to:

== Places ==
- Kék, a village in eastern Hungary
- Ekwok Airport (IATA: KEK), an airport in Ekwok, Alaska

== People ==
- Franci Kek (born 1964), Slovenian politician and actor
- Matjaž Kek (born 1961), Slovenian footballer and manager
- Hakka people, also known as Kek, Khek or Khek-ka

== Organizations ==
- KEK, a Japanese particle physics research organization
- Party of Greek Hunters (Greek: Κόμμα Ελλήνων Κυνηγών), a Greek political party
- KF KEK, a football club based in Obilić, Kosovo

== Other uses ==
- Kek (mythology), Egyptian god
- Q'eqchi' language (ISO 639-3: kek), a Mayan language
- Key encryption key, a cryptographic term
- "Kek", a song by singer Nil Karaibrahimgil in her album Nil Dünyası
- "Kek", or "kekeke"/"ㅋㅋㅋ", a Korean onomatopoeia of laughter used similarly to "LOL"
- Cult of Kek, a parody religion associated with alt-right politics

== See also ==
- KEKS, a Kansas radio station
- Leibniz-Keks, a German biscuit brand
- Keck (disambiguation)
