= Margaret Kamar =

Kenyan politician (born 1959)

Margaret Jepkoech Kamar

Deputy Speaker of the Senate of Kenya
- In office 2017–2022
- President: Uhuru Kenyatta

Senator for Uasin Gishu County
- In office 2017–2022

MP for Eldoret East
- In office 2007–2012

Personal details
- Born: April 28, 1959 (age 67) Keiyo, Kenya
- Party: Jubilee Party and ODM
- Education: Moi University; McGill University (MEd); University of Toronto (PhD)
- Profession: Soil Scientist, Politician

Margaret Jepkoech Kamar (born 28 April 1959) is a Kenyan politician and a former deputy speaker of the Senate of Kenya. She is the first elected female Deputy Speaker in the history of the Kenyan Senate. She currently belongs to the Jubilee Alliance Party. She was first elected as an MP in 2007 for Eldoret East. In 2017, she was elected to represent the Uasin Gishu County in the Senate of Kenya.

== Biography ==
Kamar was born on 28 April 1959 in Keiyo, Kenya. She obtained a HBSc in Agriculture at Punjab Agricultural University. She later obtained an MEd in Agriculture from McGill University in 1986 and a PhD in Soil Science from the Faculty of Forestry and Conservation of the University of Toronto.

In 1988, she served as Soils Consultant at UNEP during the development of the Desertification Map. She became a professor in Soil Science at Moi University in 1999 and held various positions at the university.

From 1999 to 2006, she was a member of the East African Legislative Assembly and chaired the Environment, Natural Resources, Agriculture and Tourism committee. She also led the delegation to the World Summit on Sustainable Development (WSSD) to South Africa in 2002.

Between 2008 and 2010, she was the delegation leader to the African, Caribbean and Pacific and European Union Joint Parliamentary Assembly (ACP-EU JPA). She also served as the Assistant Minister Environment and Mineral Resources from 2010 to 2011 and Minister of Higher Education, Science and Technology from 2011 to 2013.

In 2013, she became the director at the International Centre for Research in Sustainable Development, a non-governmental organisation.
