= Demographics of Kenya =

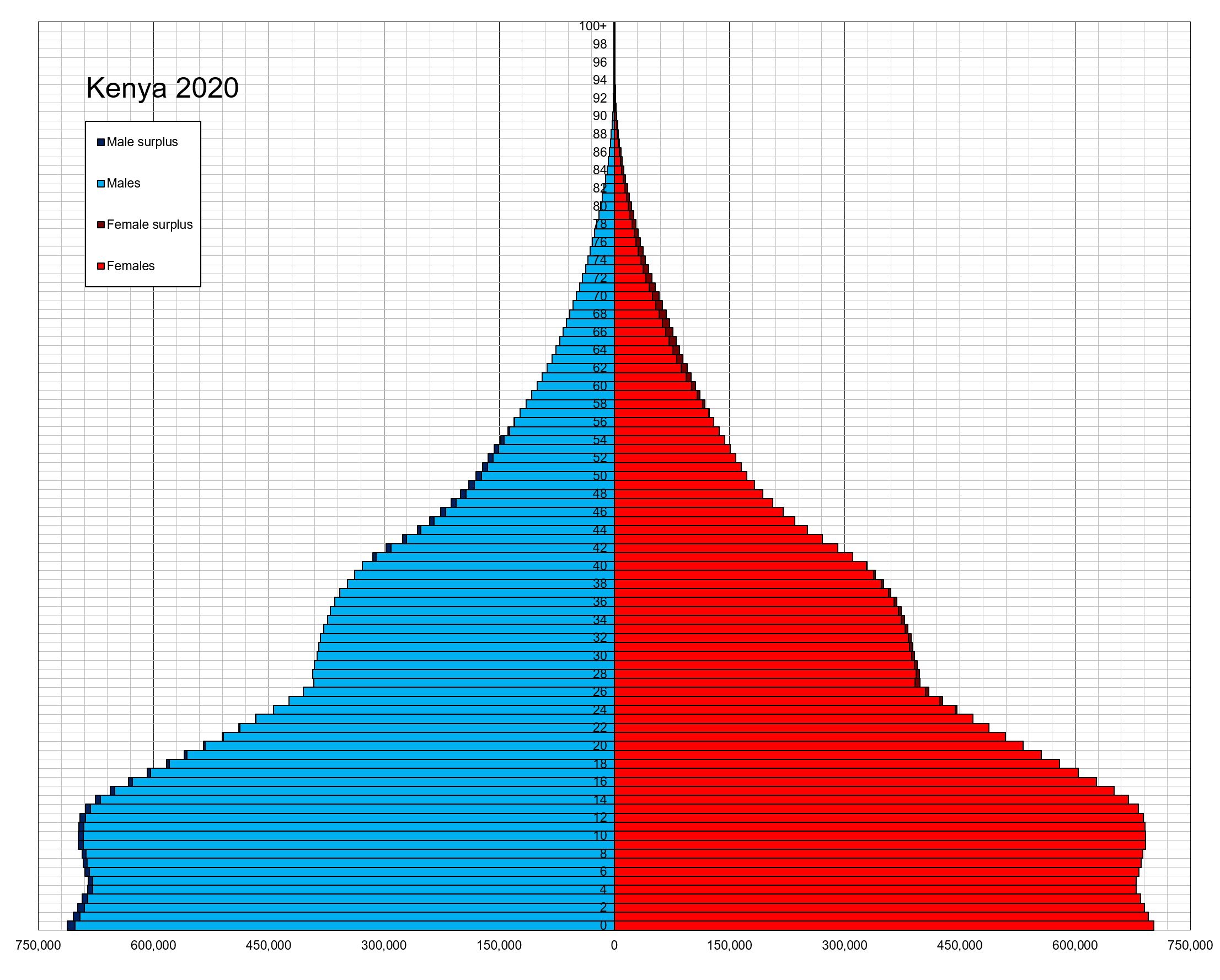
- Population pyramid of Kenya in 2020
- Population: 51,044,355 (2022 est.)
- Growth rate: 2.12% (2022 est.)
- Birth rate: 26.39 births/1,000 population
- Death rate: 5.01 deaths/1,000 population
- Life expectancy: 69.69 years
  - male: 67.98 years
  - female: 71.43 years
- Fertility rate: 3.19 children born/woman (2024)
- Infant mortality: 27.86 deaths/1,000 live births
- Net migration rate: -0.19 migrant(s)/1,000 population

Nationality
- Nationality: Kenyan

The Demographics of Kenya is monitored by the Kenya National Bureau of Statistics. Kenya is a multi-ethnic state in East Africa. Its total population was at 47,558,296 as of the 2019 census.

A national census was conducted in 1999, although the results were never released. A new census was undertaken in 2009, but turned out to be controversial, as the questions about ethnic affiliation seemed inappropriate after the ethnic violence of the previous year. Preliminary results of the census were published in 2010.

Kenya's population was reported as 47.6 million during the 2019 census compared to 38.6 million inhabitants 2009, 30.7 million in 1999, 21.4 million in 1989, and 15.3 million in 1979. This was an increase of a factor of 2.5 over 30 years, or an average growth rate of more than 3 percent per year. The population growth rate has been reported as reduced during the 2000s, and was estimated at 2.7 percent (as of 2010), resulting in an estimate of 46.5 million in 2016. As of 2024 Kenya has 770,255 refugees and asylum seekers.

== Population ==
Census population

Year	Pop.	±% p.a.
1962	9,980,563	—
1969	10,942,705	+1.32%
1979	15,327,061	+3.43%
1989	21,443,636	+3.42%

Year	Pop.	±% p.a.
1999	28,686,607	+2.95%
2009	38,610,097	+3.02%
2019	47,564,296	+2.11%

According to the 2022 revision of the World Population Prospects, the total population was 53,005,614 in 2021 compared to 6,077,000 in 1950, and around 1,700,000 in 1900. The proportion of children below the age of 15 in 2010 was 42.5%, 54.9% between the ages of 15 and 65, and 2.7% was 65 years or older. Worldometers estimates the total population at 48,466,928 inhabitants, a 29th global rank.

Year	Total population	Population percentage		
Year	Total population	aged 0–14	aged 15–64	aged 65+
1950	6 077 000	39.8%	56.3%	3.9%
1955	6 980 000	42.8%	53.4%	3.8%
1960	8 105 000	46.4%	49.9%	3.7%
1965	9 505 000	48.4%	48.0%	3.6%
1970	11 252 000	49.1%	47.5%	3.4%
1975	13 486 000	49.6%	47.1%	3.3%
1980	16 268 000	50.0%	47.1%	3.0%
1985	19 655 000	50.0%	47.2%	2.8%
1990	23 447 000	49.0%	48.3%	2.7%
1995	27 426 000	46.5%	50.8%	2.7%
2000	31 254 000	44.3%	52.9%	2.8%
2005	35 615 000	42.7%	54.5%	2.8%
2010	40 513 000	42.5%	54.9%	2.7%
2019	47 564 296	39.0%	57.1%	3.9%

Population by Sex and Age Group (Census 24.VIII.2009):

Age group	Male	Female	Total	%
Total	19 192 458	19 417 639	38 610 097	100
0–4	3 000 439	2 938 867	5 939 306	15.38
5–9	2 832 669	2 765 047	5 597 716	14.50
10–14	2 565 313	2 469 542	5 034 855	13.04
15–19	2 123 653	2 045 890	4 169 543	10.80
20–24	1 754 105	2 020 998	3 775 103	9.78
25–29	1 529 116	1 672 110	3 201 226	8.29
30–34	1 257 035	1 262 471	2 519 506	6.53
35–39	1 004 361	1 004 271	2 008 632	5.20
40–44	743 594	732 575	1 476 169	3.82
45–49	635 276	637 469	1 272 745	3.30
50–54	478 346	477 860	956 206	2.48
55–59	359 466	352 497	711 953	1.84
60–64	295 197	298 581	593 778	1.54
65-69	183 151	207 612	390 763	1.01
70-74	160 301	179 000	339 301	0.88
75-79	99 833	118 675	218 508	0.57
80+	159 125	224 576	383 701	0.99
Age group	Male	Female	Total	Percent
0–14	8 398 421	8 173 456	16 571 877	42.92
15–64	10 191 627	10 514 320	20 705 947	53.63
65+	602 410	729 863	1 332 273	3.45
Unknown	11 478	9 608	21 086	0.05

Population by Sex and Age Group (Census 24.VIII.2019) (The figure for both sexes includes intersex persons.):

Age group	Male	Female	Total	%
Total	23 544 372	24 011 270	47 557 157	100
0–4	3 005 496	2 985 484	5 991 128	12.60
5–9	3 116 101	3 084 445	6 200 719	13.04
10–14	3 209 544	3 136 149	6 345 864	13.34
15–19	2 686 476	2 599 905	5 286 535	11.12
20–24	2 112 777	2 335 052	4 448 037	9.35
25–29	1 839 256	2 014 546	3 853 955	8.10
30–34	1 698 354	1 871 625	3 570 133	7.51
35–39	1 347 962	1 301 624	2 649 679	5.57
40–44	1 156 932	1 101 867	2 258 861	4.75
45–49	916 166	869 740	1 785 957	3.76
50–54	662 864	645 463	1 308 371	2.75
55–59	546 852	571 000	1 117 878	2.35
60–64	419 362	450 447	869 837	1.83
65-69	311 281	346 756	658 052	1.38
70-74	235 929	278 507	514 453	1.08
75-79	119 265	163 799	283 071	0.60
80-84	82 909	120 944	203 856	0.43
85-89	43 948	69 635	113 587	0.24
90-94	19 225	35 866	55 095	0.12
95-99	9 768	18 233	28 001	0.06
100+	3 905	10 183	14 088	0.03
Age group	Male	Female	Total	Percent
0–14	9 331 141	9 206 078	18 537 711	38.98
15–64	13 387 001	13 761 269	27 149 243	57.09
65+	826 230	1 043 923	1 870 203	3.93

=== Population by province in 2019 census ===
Province	2019
Kenya (country total)	47,564,296
Nairobi (capital city)	4,397,073
Central	5,482,239
Coast	4,329,474
Eastern	6,821,049
North Eastern	2,490,073
Nyanza	6,269,579
Rift valley	12,752,966
Western	5,021,843

=== UN population projections ===
Numbers are in thousands. UN medium variant projections

- 2015 46,332
- 2020 52,563
- 2025 59,054
- 2030 65,928
- 2035 73,257
- 2040 80,975
- 2045 88,907
- 2050 96,887
View source data.
View source data.
View source data.
View source data.

== Vital statistics ==
=== United Nations estimates ===
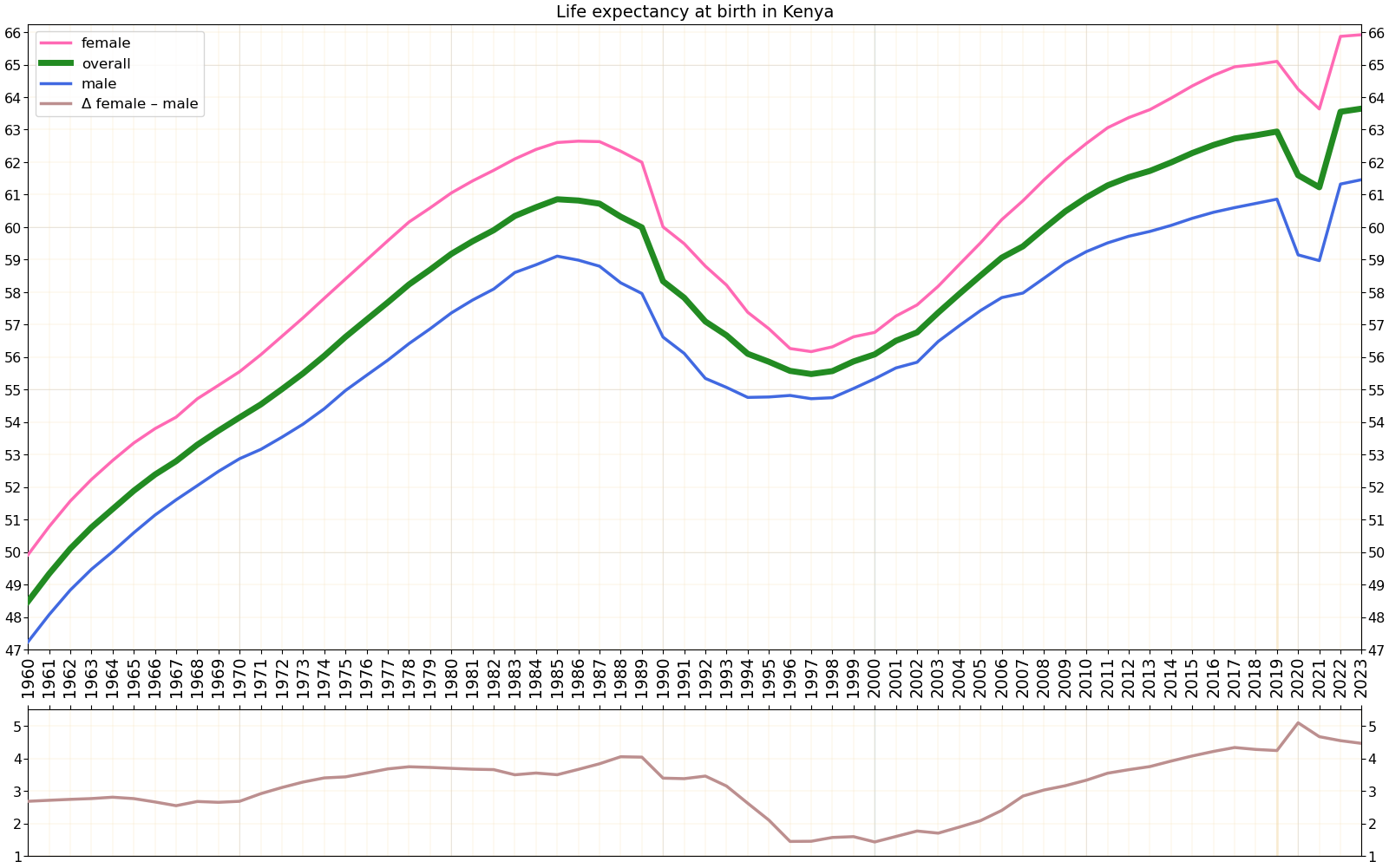
Life expectancy at birth in Kenya

Registration of vital events is in Kenya not complete. The Population Department of the United Nations prepared the following estimates.

Period	Population per year	Live births per year	Deaths per year	Natural change per year	CBR*	CDR*	NC*	TFR*	IMR*	Life expectancy (in years)
1950	5,712,000	285,000	167,000	118,000	49.5	28.9	20.6	7.33	162.2	38.90
1951	5,836,000	299,000	166,000	133,000	50.7	28.1	22.6	7.36	161.2	39.09
1952	5,975,000	313,000	168,000	146,000	51.8	27.8	24.1	7.39	159.4	38.95
1953	6,122,000	328,000	163,000	165,000	52.8	26.3	26.5	7.42	152.2	40.32
1954	6,282,000	342,000	159,000	183,000	53.7	25.0	28.7	7.45	145.3	41.69
1955	6,461,000	356,000	156,000	200,000	54.3	23.8	30.5	7.48	138.9	42.96
1956	6,657,000	372,000	154,000	219,000	55.0	22.7	32.3	7.53	132.9	44.12
1957	6,871,000	388,000	149,000	239,000	55.5	21.3	34.2	7.59	127.3	45.83
1958	7,104,000	403,000	148,000	255,000	55.6	20.4	35.2	7.60	122.2	46.88
1959	7,343,000	414,000	146,000	268,000	55.4	19.5	35.8	7.62	117.5	47.77
1960	7,609,000	428,000	145,000	283,000	55.2	18.6	36.5	7.63	113.2	48.68
1961	7,894,000	446,000	144,000	302,000	55.5	17.9	37.6	7.72	109.4	49.53
1962	8,201,000	465,000	144,000	321,000	55.6	17.2	38.4	7.80	106.0	50.22
1963	8,526,000	482,000	145,000	338,000	55.5	16.6	38.8	7.86	103.1	50.81
1964	8,868,000	500,000	146,000	354,000	55.2	16.1	39.1	7.92	100.6	51.33
1965	9,227,000	521,000	148,000	373,000	55.3	15.7	39.6	8.03	98.7	51.70
1966	9,608,000	539,000	150,000	388,000	54.9	15.3	39.6	8.06	97.0	52.10
1967	9,997,000	555,000	153,000	402,000	54.4	15.0	39.4	8.05	95.5	52.46
1968	10,405,000	572,000	155,000	417,000	53.8	14.6	39.3	8.04	94.0	52.78
1969	10,823,000	589,000	157,000	433,000	53.4	14.2	39.2	8.03	92.4	53.17
1970	11,256,000	606,000	158,000	447,000	52.7	13.8	38.9	8.02	90.8	53.58
1971	11,690,000	625,000	159,000	466,000	52.4	13.3	39.1	8.00	89.1	54.26
1972	12,107,000	639,000	158,000	481,000	51.7	12.8	38.9	7.98	87.2	55.01
1973	12,539,000	652,000	158,000	495,000	51.0	12.3	38.7	7.94	85.3	55.68
1974	12,982,000	668,000	160,000	507,000	50.4	12.1	38.3	7.91	83.3	55.63
1975	13,426,000	685,000	162,000	523,000	50.0	11.8	38.2	7.88	81.2	55.83
1976	13,878,000	704,000	164,000	540,000	49.8	11.6	38.2	7.84	79.0	55.90
1977	14,327,000	722,000	164,000	559,000	49.4	11.2	38.2	7.80	76.7	56.49
1978	14,828,000	744,000	164,000	580,000	49.2	10.8	38.4	7.75	74.4	56.94
1979	15,347,000	766,000	163,000	604,000	49.0	10.4	38.6	7.68	72.1	57.72
1980	15,894,000	787,000	162,000	626,000	48.6	10.0	38.6	7.60	70.1	58.50
1981	16,480,000	816,000	151,000	665,000	48.5	9.0	39.5	7.51	68.2	61.17
1982	17,092,000	838,000	156,000	683,000	48.1	8.9	39.1	7.40	66.5	60.95
1983	17,731,000	860,000	159,000	701,000	47.5	8.8	38.7	7.26	64.9	61.01
1984	18,408,000	888,000	164,000	724,000	47.3	8.8	38.6	7.12	63.7	60.80
1985	19,099,000	913,000	170,000	743,000	46.9	8.8	38.1	6.98	62.8	60.58
1986	19,806,000	941,000	178,000	763,000	46.6	8.8	37.8	6.85	62.4	60.22
1987	20,516,000	966,000	185,000	781,000	46.2	8.8	37.3	6.68	62.4	60.04
1988	21,248,000	982,000	195,000	788,000	45.4	9.0	36.4	6.51	62.9	59.54
1989	22,004,000	998,000	205,000	793,000	44.5	9.2	35.4	6.32	63.9	59.04
1990	22,772,000	1,008,000	216,000	793,000	43.5	9.3	34.2	6.13	65.2	58.61
1991	23,553,000	1,019,000	228,000	791,000	42.5	9.5	33.0	5.94	66.8	58.01
1992	24,284,000	1,029,000	242,000	787,000	41.7	9.8	31.9	5.75	68.3	57.26
1993	25,028,000	1,044,000	255,000	789,000	41.1	10.0	31.0	5.57	69.4	56.62
1994	25,756,000	1,062,000	266,000	796,000	40.6	10.2	30.4	5.45	70.1	56.27
1995	26,512,000	1,088,000	280,000	809,000	40.4	10.4	30.0	5.37	70.1	55.62
1996	27,245,000	1,112,000	292,000	821,000	40.2	10.5	29.7	5.31	69.7	55.16
1997	27,987,000	1,139,000	303,000	836,000	40.1	10.7	29.4	5.26	68.7	54.82
1998	28,742,000	1,174,000	313,000	861,000	40.2	10.7	29.5	5.25	67.4	54.53
1999	29,533,000	1,199,000	321,000	878,000	40.0	10.1	29.3	5.18	65.6	54.50
2000	30,398,000	1,232,000	329,000	903,000	39.9	9.9	29.3	5.14	63.6	54.41
2001	31,306,000	1,271,000	336,000	934,000	40.0	9.7	29.4	5.09	61.3	54.51
2002	32,295,000	1,298,000	339,000	959,000	39.6	9.5	29.3	5.02	58.9	54.99
2003	33,265,000	1,318,000	337,000	981,000	39.0	9.2	29.1	4.91	56.5	55.60
2004	34,270,000	1,347,000	334,000	1,013,000	38.7	8.9	29.1	4.83	54.0	56.36
2005	35,314,000	1,380,000	328,000	1,052,000	38.5	8.6	29.4	4.78	51.3	57.34
2006	36,372,000	1,414,000	323,000	1,091,000	38.5	8.3	30.2	4.75	48.8	58.22
2007	37,479,000	1,450,000	322,000	1,128,000	38.3	8.1	30.2	4.72	46.5	58.87
2008	38,595,000	1,471,000	317,000	1,154,000	37.9	7.9	30.0	4.66	43.8	59.61
2009	39,779,000	1,476,000	312,000	1,164,000	37.2	7.6	29.5	4.57	41.7	60.37
2010	40,950,000	1,471,000	314,000	1,157,000	36.3	7.4	28.8	4.45	40.2	60.65
2011	42,086,000	1,461,000	317,000	1,144,000	35.0	7.3	27.7	4.28	39.0	61.05
2012	43,185,000	1,451,000	326,000	1,125,000	33.7	7.2	26.5	4.12	38.1	61.12
2013	44,267,000	1,440,000	332,000	1,008,000	32.4	7.2	25.3	3.96	37.0	61.39
2014	45,318,000	1,436,000	335,000	1,101,000	31.5	7.1	24.4	3.84	36.0	61.82
2015	46,346,000	1,452,000	345,000	1,107,000	30.9	7.1	23.8	3.77	34.9	61.89
2016	47,357,000	1,457,000	352,000	1,105,000	30.2	7.2	23.0	3.69	33.8	62.16
2017	48,432,000	1,458,000	357,000	1,100,000	29.6	7.1	22.5	3.61	33.0	62.48
2018	49,464,000	1,460,000	365,000	1,094,000	29.0	7.2	21.9	3.54	32.0	62.68
2019	47,564,296	1,451,000	372,000	1,079,000	28.2	7.3	20.9	3.43	31.1	62.94
2020	51,460,000	1,456,000	388,000	1,068,000	27.8	7.9	19.8	3.36	30.4	62.68
2021	53,219,000	1,469,000	432,000	984,000	27.6	8.1	19.5	3.31	31.1	61.2
2022	54,252,000	1,483,000	391,000	1,082,000	27.3	7.2	20.1	3.26	30.2	63.3
2023	55,339,000	1,500,000	399,000	1,091,000	27.1	7.2	19.9	3.21	29.7	63.6
2024					27.0	7.2	19.8	3.17		
2025					26.8	7.1	19.6	3.12		
* CBR = crude birth rate (per 1000); CDR = crude death rate (per 1000); NC = natural change (per 1000); IMR = infant mortality rate per 1000 births; TFR = total fertility rate (number of children per woman)

=== Demographic and Health Surveys ===
Total Fertility Rate (TFR) (Wanted Fertility Rate) and Crude Birth Rate (CBR):

Year	Total		Urban		Rural	
Year	CBR	TFR	CBR	TFR	CBR	TFR
1977		8.1				
1984		7.7				
1989		6.7		4.5		7.1
1993	35.8	5.40 (3.4)	35.1	3.44 (2.5)	35.9	5.80 (3.7)
1998	34.6	4.70 (3.5)	33.6	3.12 (2.6)	34.7	5.16 (3.8)
2003	37.5	4.9 (3.6)	35.3	3.3 (2.6)	38.1	5.4 (3.9)
2008–2009 (census)	34,8	4.6 (3.4)	32.5	2.9 (2.5)	35.3	5.2 (3.7)
2014	30.5	3.9 (3.0)	31.0	3.1 (2.6)	30.3	4.5 (3.4)
2022	27.7	3.4 (2.9)	30.1	2.7 (2.5)	26.6	4.0 (3.3)
2025-26	24.7	3.1 (2.7)	27.0	2.6 (2.4)	23.3	3.6 (3.0)

Fertility data as of 2014 (DHS Program):

Region	Total fertility rate	Percentage of women age 15–49 currently pregnant	Mean number of children ever born to women age 40–49
Coast	4.3	6.6	5.5
North Eastern	6.4	12.0	7.1
Eastern	3.4	4.6	4.7
Central	2.8	4.8	3.7
Rift Valley	4.5	7.0	5.5
Western	4.7	6.7	6.1
Nyanza	4.3	5.9	5.8
Nairobi	2.7	6.8	3.1

== Ethnic groups ==
Kenya has a very diverse population that includes most major ethnic, racial and linguistic groups found in Africa. Bantu, Cushitic and Nilotic populations together constitute around 99% of the nation's inhabitants. People from Asian or European heritage living in Kenya are estimated at around 0.3% of the population.

Bantus are the single largest population division in Kenya. Most Bantu are farmers. Some of the prominent Bantu groups in Kenya include the Kikuyu, the Kamba, the Luhya, the Kisii, the Meru, and the Mijikenda.

In Kenya's last colonial census of 1962, population groups residing in the territory included European, African and Asian individuals. According to the Kenya National Bureau of Statistics, Kenya had a population of 47,564,296 by 2019. The largest native ethnic groups were the Kikuyu (8,148,668), Luhya (6,820,000), Kalenjin (6,358,113), Luo (5,066,966), Kamba (4,663,910), Somalis (2,780,502), Kisii (2,703,235), Mijikenda (2,488,691), Meru (1,975,869), Maasai (1,189,522), and Turkana (1,016,174). Foreign-rooted populations included Asians (90,527), Europeans (42,868) with Kenyan citizenship, 26,753 without, and Kenyan Arabs (59,021). The number of ethnic categories and sub-categories recorded in the census has changed significantly over time, expanding from 42 in 1969 to more than 120 in 2019.

=== Bantu peoples ===
Bantus are the single largest population division in Kenya. The term Bantu denotes widely dispersed but related peoples that speak south-central Niger–Congo languages. Originally from Cameroon-Nigeria border regions, Bantus began a millennium-long series of migrations referred to as the Bantu expansion that first brought them south into East Africa about 2,000 years ago.

Most Bantu are farmers. Some of the prominent Bantu groups in Kenya include the Kikuyu, the Kamba, the Luhya, the Kisii, the Meru, and the Mijikenda. The Swahili people are descended from Wangozi Bantu peoples that intermarried with Arab immigrants.

The Kikuyu, who are one of the biggest tribes in Kenya, seem to have assimilated a significant number of Cushitic speakers. Evidence from their Y DNA shows that 18% of Kikuyu carry the E1b1b Y DNA.

=== Nilotic peoples ===
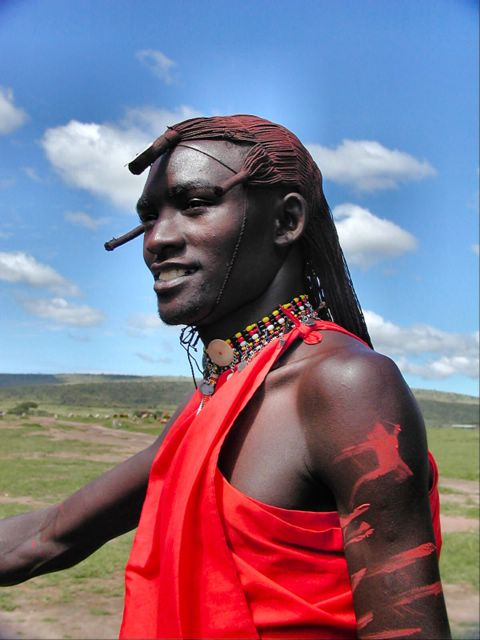
A Maasai

Nilotes are the second-largest group of peoples in Kenya. They speak Nilo-Saharan languages and went south into East Africa from Western Asia and North Africa by way of South Sudan. Most Nilotes in Kenya are historically pastoralists. The Nilotes are divided into the river lake Nilotes and the highland nilotes. These divisions are related to where they occupied after they relocated to Kenya. Where the Luo are affiliated with the river lake occupancy as they can be found near Lake Victoria. The Kalenjin along others are affiliated with the highland occupancy as they are found around the highland areas of the country. The most prominent of these groups include the Luo, the Maasai, the Samburu, the Iteso, the Turkana, and the Kalenjin. Similar to the Bantu, some Nilotic systems of governance (such as Ibinda of the Nandi) bear similarities with those of their Cushitic neighbors (such as the Gada system of the Oromo).

=== Cushitic people ===
The Cushitic people form a small minority of Kenya's population. They speak languages belonging to the Afroasiatic family and originally came from Ethiopia and Somalia. However, some large ethnic Somali clans are native to the area that used be known as NFD in Kenya. These people are not from Somalia but share the same ethnicity as the majority in Somalia. Most of them are herdsmen and have almost entirely adopted Islam. Cushites are concentrated in the northernmost North Eastern Province, which borders Somalia.

The Cushitic people are divided into two groups: the Southern Cushites and the Eastern Cushites.

- The Southern Cushites were the second-earliest inhabitants of Kenya after the indigenous hunter-gatherer groups, and the first of the Cushitic-speaking peoples to migrate from their homeland in the Horn of Africa about 2,000 years ago. They were progressively displaced in a southerly direction or absorbed, or both, by the incoming Nilotic and Bantu groups until they wound up in Tanzania. There are no Southern Cushites left in Kenya. (The Dahalo were originally pre-Cushitic peoples who adopted the language of their dominant Southern Cushitic neighbors sometime toward the last millennium BC.).
- The Eastern Cushites include the Oromo and the Somali. After the Northern Frontier District (North Eastern Province) was handed over to Kenyan nationalists at the end of British colonial rule in Kenya, Somalis in the region fought the Shifta War against Kenyan troops to join their kin in the Somali Republic to the north. Although the war ended in a cease-fire, Somalis in the region still identify and maintain close ties with their kin in Somalia and see themselves as one people, since like most borders in Africa and Asia, national borders were arbitrarily drawn in colonial European countries, especially during the Scramble for Africa

An entrepreneurial community, they established themselves in the business sector, particularly in Eastleigh, Nairobi.

=== Indians ===
Asians living in Kenya are descended from South Asian migrants. Significant Asian migration to Kenya began between 1896 and 1901 when some 32,000 indentured labourers were recruited from British India to build the Kenya-Uganda Railway. The majority of Kenyan Asians hail from the Gujarat and Punjab regions. The community grew significantly during the colonial period, and in the 1962 census Asians made up a third of the population of Nairobi and consisted of 176,613 people across the country.

Since Kenyan independence large numbers have emigrated due to racism-related tensions with the Bantu and Nilotic majority. Most Asians are concentrated in the manufacturing sector. There are around 100,000 Indians in Kenya. According to the 2019 Census, Kenyan Asians number 47,555 people, while Asians without Kenyan citizenship number 42,972 individuals. In 2017, Kenyans of Asian Heritage were officially recognised as the 44th tribe of Kenya by President Uhuru Kenyatta.

=== Europeans ===
Europeans in Kenya are primarily the descendants of British migrants during the colonial period. There is also a significant expat population of Europeans living in Kenya. Economically, all Europeans in Kenya belong to the middle- and upper-middle-class. Nowadays, only a small minority of them are landowners (livestock and game ranchers, horticulturists and farmers), with the majority working in the tertiary sector: in air transport, finance, import, and hospitality. Apart from isolated individuals such as anthropologist and conservationist Richard Leakey, F.R.S., who died in 2022, Kenyan-Europeans have completely retreated from Kenyan politics, and are no longer represented in public service and parastatals, from which the last remaining staff from colonial times retired in the 1970s. According to the 2019 Census, Kenyan Europeans number 42,868 people, while Europeans without Kenyan citizenship number 26,753 individuals. 0.3% of the population of Kenya is either from Asia or Europe.

=== Arabs ===
Arabs form a small but historically important minority ethnic group in Kenya. They are principally concentrated along the coast in cities such as Mombasa, Malindi, Lamu, and Nairobi. A Muslim community, they primarily came from Oman and Hadhramaut in Yemen, and are engaged in trade. Arabs are locally referred to as Washihiri or, less commonly, as simply Shihiri in the Bantu Swahili language, Kenya's lingua franca. According to the 2019 Census, Kenyan Arabs number 59,021 people.

== Languages ==
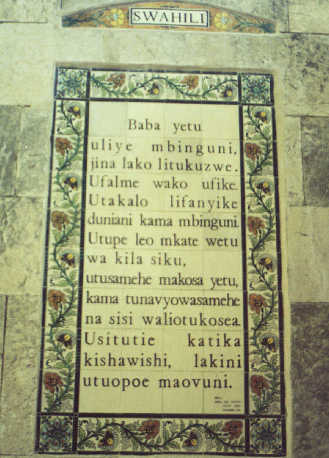
Lord's Prayer in Swahili, a Bantu language that alongside English serves as a lingua franca for many in Kenya.

Kenya's various ethnic groups typically speak their mother tongues within their own communities. The two official languages, English and Swahili, serve as the main lingua franca between the various ethnic groups. English is widely spoken in commerce, schooling and government. Peri-urban and rural dwellers are less multilingual, with many in rural areas speaking only their native languages.

According to Ethnologue, there are a total of 69 languages spoken in Kenya. Most belong to two broad language families: Niger-Congo (Bantu branch) and Nilo-Saharan (Nilotic branch), which are spoken by the country's Bantu and Nilotic populations, respectively. The Cushitic and Arab ethnic minorities speak languages belonging to the separate Afro-Asiatic family, with the Indian and European residents speaking languages from the Indo-European family.

== Religion ==
Pew Research Center (2020)
religion	percent
Christianity	84.5%
Islam	10.5%
None	2.3%
Traditionalists	1.5%
Other	1.1%
Unspecified	0.1%

CIA World Factbook estimate:

- Christian 68.5%
  - Protestant 26.3%
  - Roman Catholic 17.6%
  - Evangelical 17.4%
  - African Instituted Churches 5%
  - Other Christian 4.1%
- Islam 26.2

%

- Other 1.8%
- None 1.6%
- Unspecified 0.2%

== See also ==
- 2019 Kenya Population and Housing Census
- Geography of Kenya
