= Ainabkoi Constituency =

Electoral constituency of Kenya

Ainabkoi
- constituency for the Parliament of Kenya
- Ainabkoi Constituency within Uasin Gishu County

- Uasin Gishu County within Kenya
- County: Uasin Gishu
- Population: 138,184
- Area: 483 km^{2} (186.5 sq mi)

Current constituency
- Number of members: 1
- Party: UDA
- Member of Parliament: Samuel Chepkonga
- Wards: 3

Ainabkoi is a constituency in Kenya, one of six constituencies in Uasin Gishu County. It was created in 2010 from parts of Eldoret East constituency.

== Electoral history ==
Elections	MP	Party	Notes
Ainabkoi Constituency created from Eldoret East
2013	Samuel Chepkonga	URP	
2017	William Chepkut	Independent	
2022	Samuel Chepkonga	UDA	

== Detailed election results ==
=== 2017 General Election ===
General election 2017: Ainabkoi
Party	Candidate	Votes	%
Independent	William Kamuren Chirchir Chepkut	23,216	54.4
Jubilee	Samuel Kiprono Chepkong'a	19,140	44.8
KANU	Cherono Raymond Toroitich	190	0.4
Independent	Wycliffe Mosi	160	0.4
Majority		4,076	9.5
