= Joint clip =

Prevents a joint from separating during a reaction process

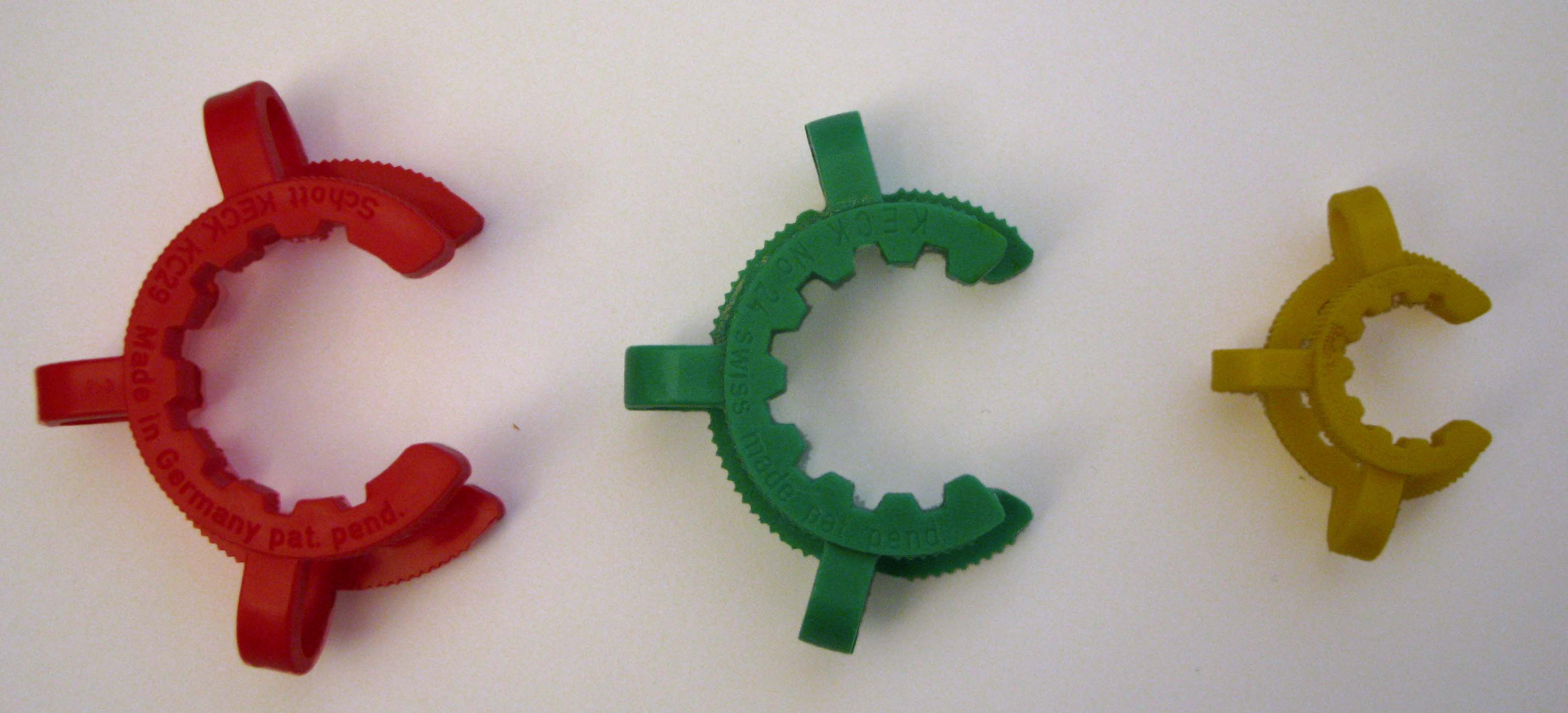
Plastic joint clips

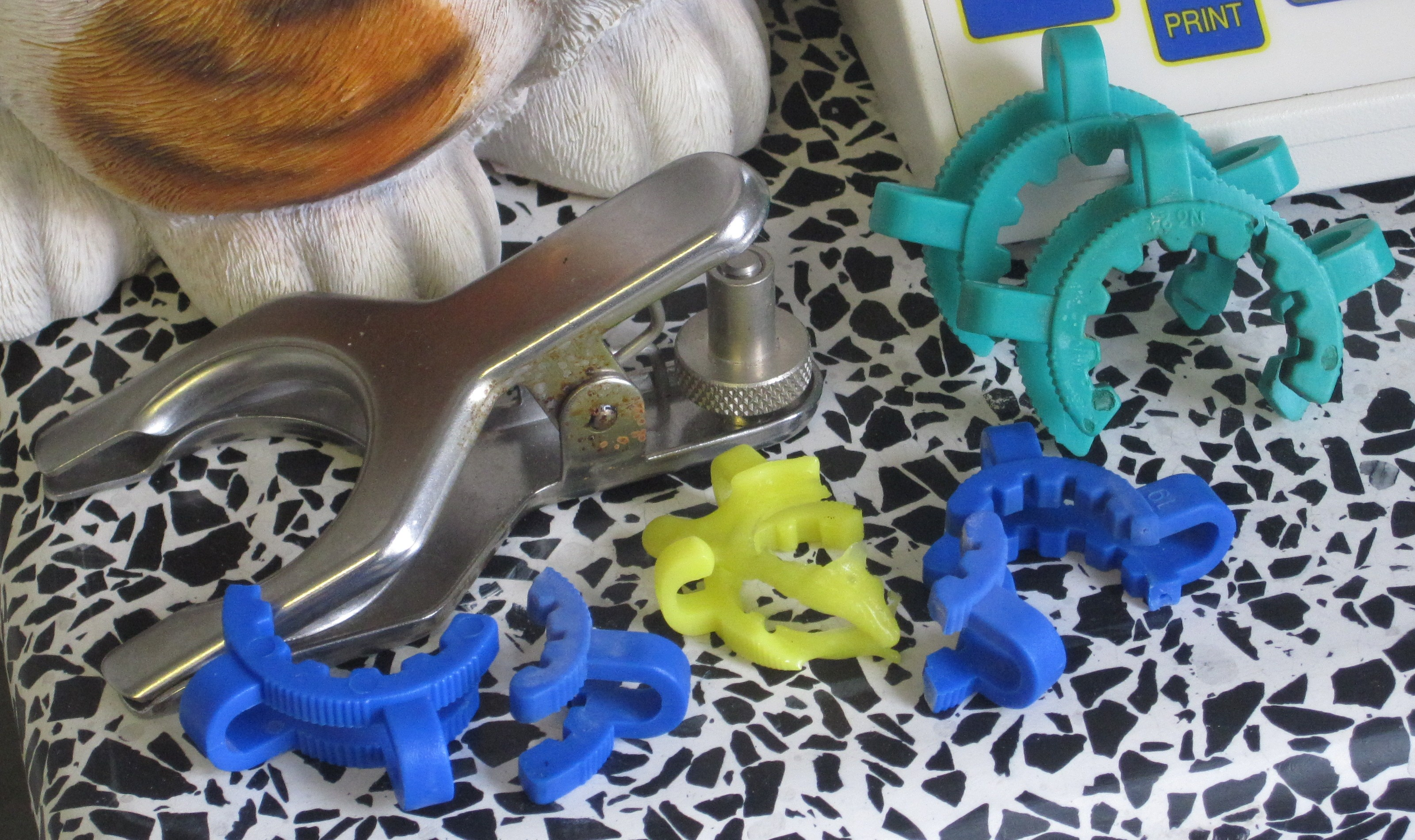
Plastic joint clips failing due to corrosive and thermal exposure

Joint clips (or Keck clips) are used to prevent laboratory glassware joints from separating during a reaction process. They are used to secure the two sides together and are available in a variety of materials for different temperature and chemical environments.

== Plastic joint clips ==
Plastic joint clips are usually made of polyacetal, and are colored according to joint sizes. Polyacetal melts at a reasonably low temperature (around 175 °C) and begins to soften around 140 °C. Polyacetal clips suffer another problem in that the material is strongly affected by the corrosive gases.

Color-coded plastic joint clips were invented by Hermann Keck in 1980. Hence, they're also referred to as "Keck clips".

== PTFE joint clips ==
Polytetrafluoroethylene (PTFE) joint clips are sometimes used, as its recommended temperature peak matches that of most chemistry work. Its highly inert nature also makes it immune to degradation around corrosive gases. However, it is both expensive and will begin producing hydrogen fluoride if heated to beyond its specified temperature. The same is true of using Krytox and chemically resistant Molykote (PTFE thickened, fluoro-based) oils and greases for glassware seals.

== Stainless steel joint clips ==
The handling of the high grade stainless steel joint clips for conical ground glass joints

Stainless steel can withstand the entire temperature spectrum of borosilicate glass and is reasonably inert. Some glassware features barbs (Devil's horns / Viking helmet) sticking out the sides of the tapers. Small stainless steel springs are used on these to hold the joint together. The use of springs is of particular benefit when dealing with positive pressures, as they apply enough force for the glass to operate, but will open the taper if an unexpected excursion occurs.
