= Kech =

Kech may refer to:

== Places ==
- Kech, Khyber Pakhtunkhwa, Pakistan
- Kech District, Balochistan, Pakistan
- Kech River, in Iran and Pakistan
- Kech, Iran (disambiguation), the alternative spelling of several places in Iran

== Other uses ==
- KECH-FM, a radio station in Idaho, U.S.

== See also ==
- Kech District attack (disambiguation)
- Kek (disambiguation)
- Ketch, a sailboat
- Makran, a coastal strip in Balochistan, in Pakistan and Iran, called Kech Makran on the Pakistani side
