= Stookey Township, St. Clair County, Illinois =

Coordinates: 38°31′11″N 90°05′24″W

Stookey Township
- Township
- Location in St. Clair County

- St. Clair County's location in Illinois
- Country: United States
- State: Illinois
- County: St. Clair
- Established: November 6, 1883

Area
  - Total: 27.46 sq mi (71.1 km^{2})
  - Land: 27.25 sq mi (70.6 km^{2})
  - Water: 0.21 sq mi (0.54 km^{2}) 0.76%

Population (2010)
  - Estimate (2016): 9,404
  - Density: 367.3/sq mi (141.8/km^{2})
- Time zone: UTC-6 (CST)
  - Summer (DST): UTC-5 (CDT)
- FIPS code: 17-163-72988
- Website: Stookey Township Official Website

Stookey Township is a township located in St. Clair County, Illinois. It is an unincorporated part of Belleville, Illinois located just west of downtown Belleville, for that reason it is often referred to by locals as Belleville West. As of the 2010 census, its population was 10,007 and it contained 4,394 housing units.

Residential homes and small businesses occupy the region along with occasional shopping centers. The township rides along Illinois Route 13 and converges with Illinois Route 15 and Illinois Route 159. The ZIP codes for the township is 62223 & 62260. The telephone area code of the township is 618.

== Geography ==
According to the 2010 census, the township has a total area of 27.46 square miles (71.1 km^{2}), of which 27.25 square miles (70.6 km^{2}) (or 99.24%) is land and 0.21 square miles (0.54 km^{2}) (or 0.76%) is water.

== Transportation ==
One MetroLink light rail station, Memorial Station, and about two dozen MetroBus stops are located around the Township.

The Illinois West-Central Railway also runs through the township in which supply and cargo freight trains run through at least a few times a day on the way to Chicago, IL, Saint Louis, MO, or East Saint Louis, IL.

The closest airport to Stookey Township is the Mid-America Airport, which is about 12 miles to the east of the township. The closest major international airport is Lambert-Saint Louis International Airport which is west of Saint Louis, MO and about 25 miles away.

== Demographics ==
Historical population
Census	Pop.	Note	%±
1890	1,423		—
1900	1,322		−7.1%
1910	1,822		37.8%
1920	2,111		15.9%
1930	962		−54.4%
1940	1,381		43.6%
1950	2,229		61.4%
1960	8,385		276.2%
1970	9,955		18.7%
1980	9,726		−2.3%
1990	10,596		8.9%
2000	10,007		−5.6%
2010	9,895		−1.1%
2020	9,219		−6.8%
2023 (est.)	9,106		−1.2%
U.S. Decennial Census

=== 2017 Census ===
As of the 2017 Census, there were 9,496 people, 3,786 households At 2.5 persons per household. The median age is 43.

Age Range	Percentage
0–9	11.5%
10–19	12.5%
20–29	7.8%
30–39	14.4%
40–49	11.2%
50–59	15.2%
60–69	14.3%
70–79	7.7%
80+	5.4%

The racial makeup was 81% White, 15% African American, 2% Hispanic, and 1% from two or more races. The population is 52% female.

== Education ==
The main public high school that serves the area is Belleville High School-West which was, in 2003, moved from its old location at 2600 West Main Street (now Lindenwood University's Belleville Campus) to its new location at 4063 Frank Scott Parkway West.

=== Public schools ===
- Belleville School District 118
  - Abe Lincoln School, 820 Royal Heights Rd., Belleville IL 62226
  - Central Jr. High School, 1801 Central School Rd., Belleville, IL 62220
  - Douglas School, 125 Carlyle Ave., Belleville, IL 62220
  - Franklin School, 301 N. 2nd St., Belleville, IL 62220
  - Henry Raab School, 1120 Union Ave., Belleville, IL 62220
  - Jefferson School, 1400 N. Charles St., Belleville, IL 62221
  - Roosevelt School, 700 West Cleveland, Belleville, IL 62220
  - Union School, 20 S. 27th St., Belleville, IL 62220
  - Washington School, 400 South Charles, Belleville, IL 62220
  - Westhaven School, 118 Westhaven School Rd., Belleville, IL 62220
  - West Jr. High School, 840 Royal Heights Rd., Belleville, IL 62226
- Belleville Township High School District 201
  - Belleville High School-West, 4063 Frank Scott Parkway West, Belleville, IL 62223
  - Belleville High School-East, 2555 West Blvd., Belleville, IL 62221
- Harmony-Emge District 175
  - Ellis Elementary, 250 Illini Dr., Belleville, IL 62223
  - Harmony Intermediate, 7401 Westchester Dr, Belleville, IL 62223
  - Emge Junior High, 7401 Westchester Dr, Belleville, IL 62223
- Signal Hill School District 181, 40 Signal Hill Place, Belleville, Illinois 62223
- Millstadt District 160, 211 W Mill Street, Millstadt IL 62260

=== Private schools ===
- Althoff Catholic High School, 5401 West Main St., Belleville, IL 62226
- Our Lady Queen of Peace School, 5915 North Belt West, Belleville, IL 62223

=== Higher education ===
- Saint Louis University Belleville Campus
- Lindenwood University – Belleville
- Southwestern Illinois College

== Government ==
Stookey Township is governed by a Board of Trustees, a Township Supervisor, an assessor, clerk, and Highway commissioner.

== Infrastructure ==
=== Utilities ===
Utility companies that work in the area are the Ameren IP Company (providing both electricity and natural gas), the Illinois-American Water Company, Stookey Township Sewer and Belleville Sewage. Since Stookey Township isn't officially part of Belleville, it does not receive city trash service—several public and privately owned trash collection companies are available to choose from. Residents must contact a collection company to set up deals on trash collection. Citizens of Stookey also cannot get library cards or check out books at Belleville libraries. No libraries exist so far in Stookey Township. Stookey township citizens are protected by the Signal Hill and Villa Hills volunteer fire departments and the St. Clair County Sheriff, but Belleville city police do not have jurisdiction in Stookey Township.

=== Belleville Crossing ===
Belleville Crossing is a shopping center and retail/business plaza that was constructed by the Desco Group under the contractor Impact Strategies. The first stores opened in this plaza in October, 2007. While technically annexed by Belleville Township proper (City of Belleville), it is located in the heart of Stookey Township near the Belleville West High School at the intersection of Illinois Route 15, and Frank Scott Parkway.

=== Religious sites ===
The National Shrine of Our Lady of the Snows is a Marian shrine set on 200 acres of wooded land located in Belleville.

== Notable people ==
- Jenny Bindon - Goalkeeper for the New Zealand Women's Football Team at the 2007 Women's World Cup and 2008 Summer Olympics in Beijing; grew up in Stookey Township.
- Jay Farrar - musician and songwriter; lived in Stookey Township.
- Fred Keck - Illinois state representative and farmer; born in Stookey Township.
