= Sindo =

Sindo may refer to:

== Media ==
- The Sindo, nickname for the Sunday Independent (Ireland), a newspaper
- Koran Sindo, an Indonesian newspaper
- Sindo TV, former name of iNews, an Indonesian television network

== Places ==
- Sindo County, North Pyongan Province, North Korea
- Sindo (island), an island off Incheon, South Korea
- Sindo, Kenya, a neighboring town of Mbita Point
- Sindo Department, Kénédougou Province, Burkina Faso

== Other ==
- Sindo (religion), "way of the gods", a name of Korean folk religion or shamanism
- SINDO, a method in quantum chemistry
- Sindo Garay (1867–1968), Cuban trova musician
