= Jepkoech =

Jepkoech or Chepkoech is a name of Kenyan origin meaning "born at sunrise" that may refer to:

- Eunice Jepkoech Sum (born 1988), Kenyan runner and 2013 world champion in the 800 metres
- Margaret Jepkoech Kamar, Kenyan National Assembly member for the Orange Democratic Movement
- Ruth Jepkoech Kutol (born 1973), Kenyan marathon runner

== See also ==
- Kipkoech, related surname for males born at sunrise. The son of Kipkoech is arap Koech
