= Kipkoech =

Kipkoech is a given name of Kenyan origin meaning "(male) born in the morning". Son/daughters of Kipkoech would then be named "Koech" as their last name and given their individual given names; achieved by just removing the prefix "kip" as it happens to most other similar names that start with 'Kip" from that particular community or whoever understands the meaning and ways to inherit the name.

- Benjamin Kipkoech Limo (born 1974), Kenyan track runner and 2005 world champion over 5000 metres
- Elisha Kipkoech Tanui (born 1983), Kenyan ultra-distance runner
- John Kipkoech (born 1991), Kenyan 5000 metres runner
- Johnstone Kipkoech (born 1968), Kenyan long-distance runner
- Josphat Bett Kipkoech (born 1990), Kenyan long-distance runner
- Mathew Kipkoech Kisorio (born 1988), Kenyan half marathon runner
- Paul Kipkoech (1963–1995), Kenyan long-distance runner
- Raymond Kipkoech (born 1978), Kenyan marathon runner and Berlin marathon winner
- Robert Kipkoech Cheruiyot (born 1978), Kenyan marathon runner and four-time Boston Marathon winner
- Wilfred Kipkoech Taragon (born 1985), Kenyan half marathon runner
- Kipkoech Cheruiyot (born 1964), Kenyan middle-distance runner

== See also ==
- Jepkoech (or Chepkoech), is a given name given to girls born in the morning or sunrise. You may also to see Kipkoech.
