= Hermann Keck =

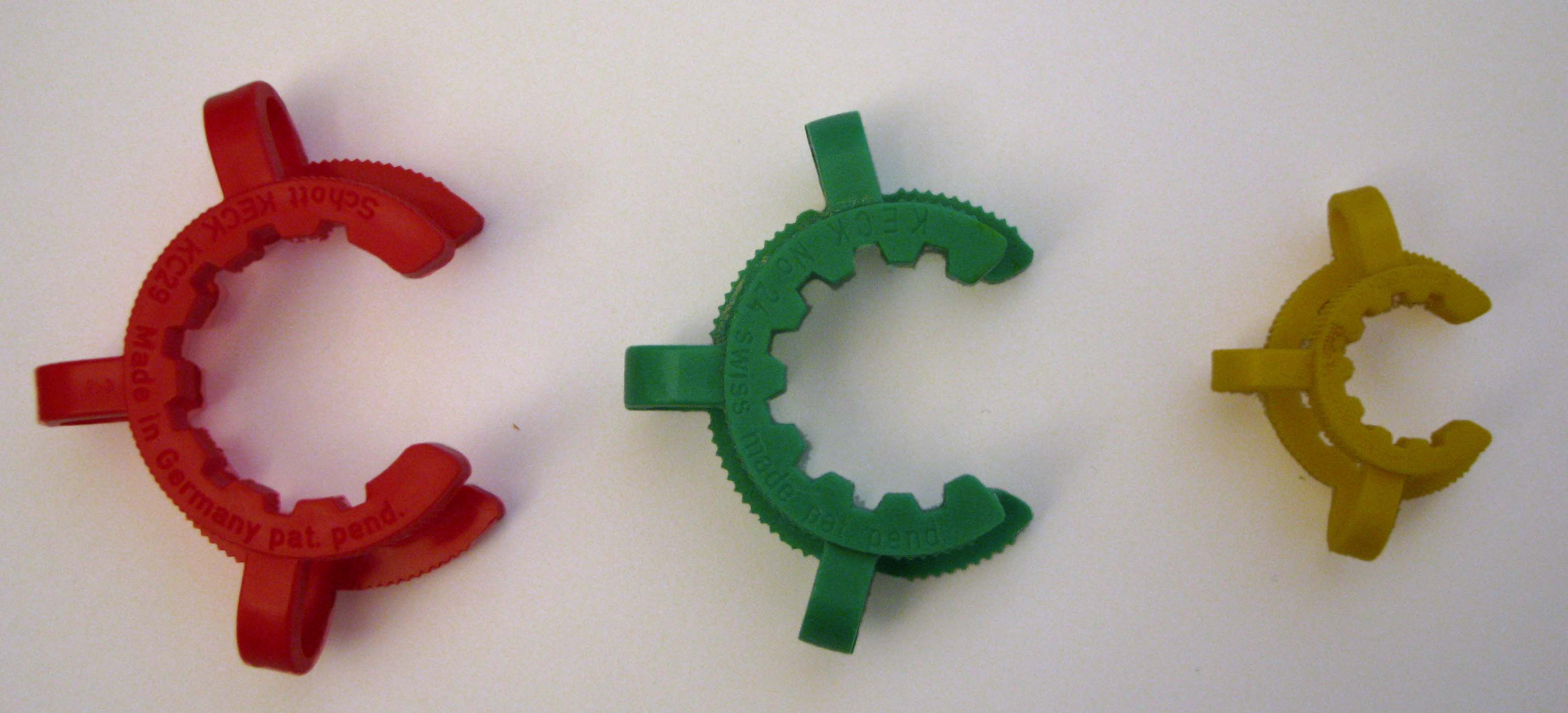
Keck Clips.

Hermann Keck (1919 – 2010) was a German scientist who invented the Keck clip.

Keck was born in Treysa and has two patents on his name:

- Clip for fixing male and female parts of ground glass joints, (1984).
- Handled clamp for ground glass ball and socket joints or the like, (1988).
