= Kenya School of TVET =

Institution of higher learning in Nairobi, Kenya

- Motto: Home of Technical Education
- Type: Public
- Established: 1978; As (Kenya Technical Teachers College)
- Principal: Dr. Edwin Tarno, PhD. HSC
- Dean: Mrs. Catherine Musuku
- Students: 2,400
- Address: P.O.Box 44600 - 00100; UN Avenue, Gigiri, Nairobi, Kenya; 1°14′25″S 36°48′59″E
- Colors: Brown Cream
- Website: http://www.kttc.ac.ke/
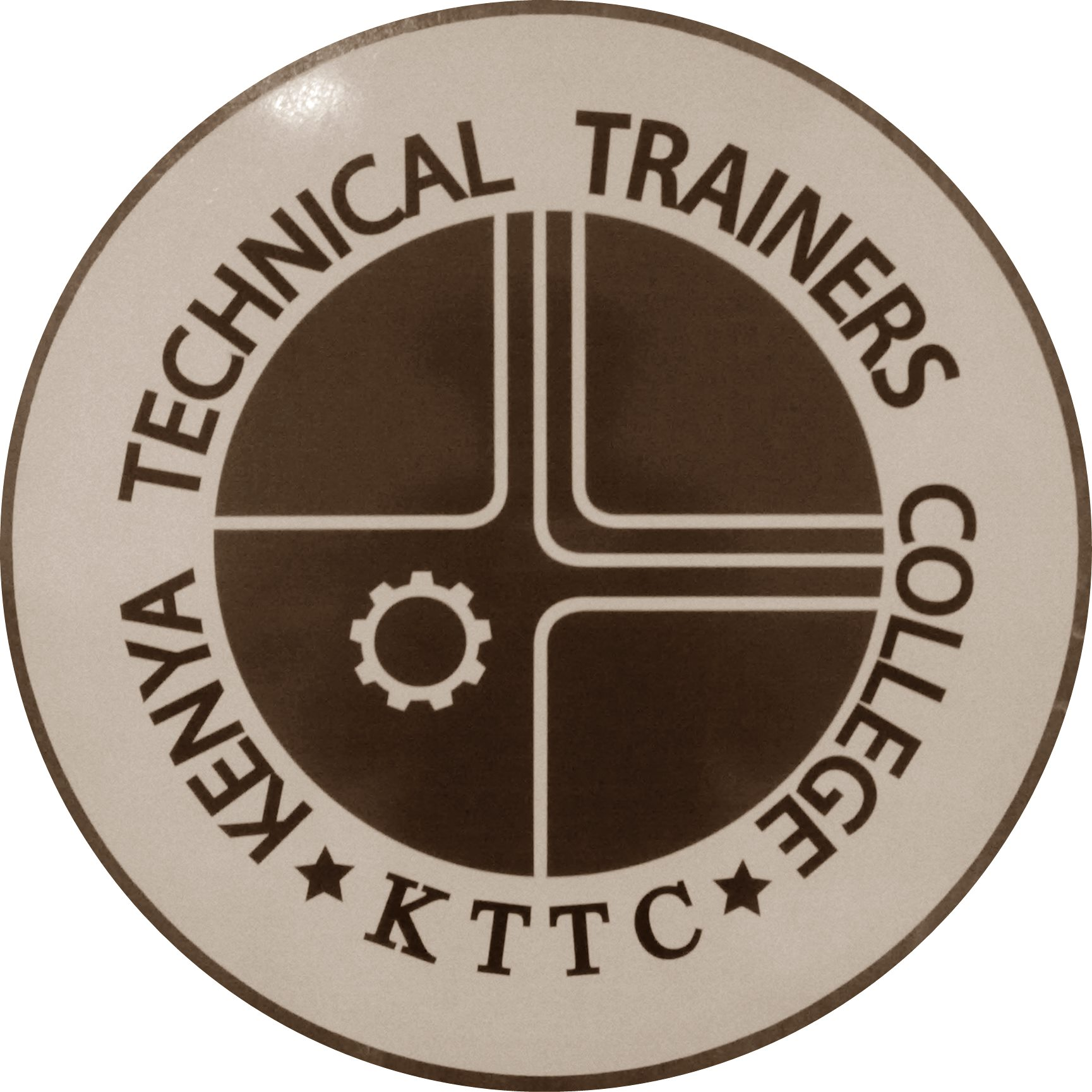

Kenya School of TVET (KSTVET) is an institution of higher learning situated in Nairobi, Kenya. It provides Technical and Vocational Education and Training (TVET). Kenya Technical Trainers College has since 2020, started training of trainers only and transferred all other students to different colleges around. The Kenya Technical Trainers College (KTTC) was renamed in 2022 to Kenya School of TVET and got a higher mandate to provide Continuous Professional Development for TVET institutions.

== Location ==
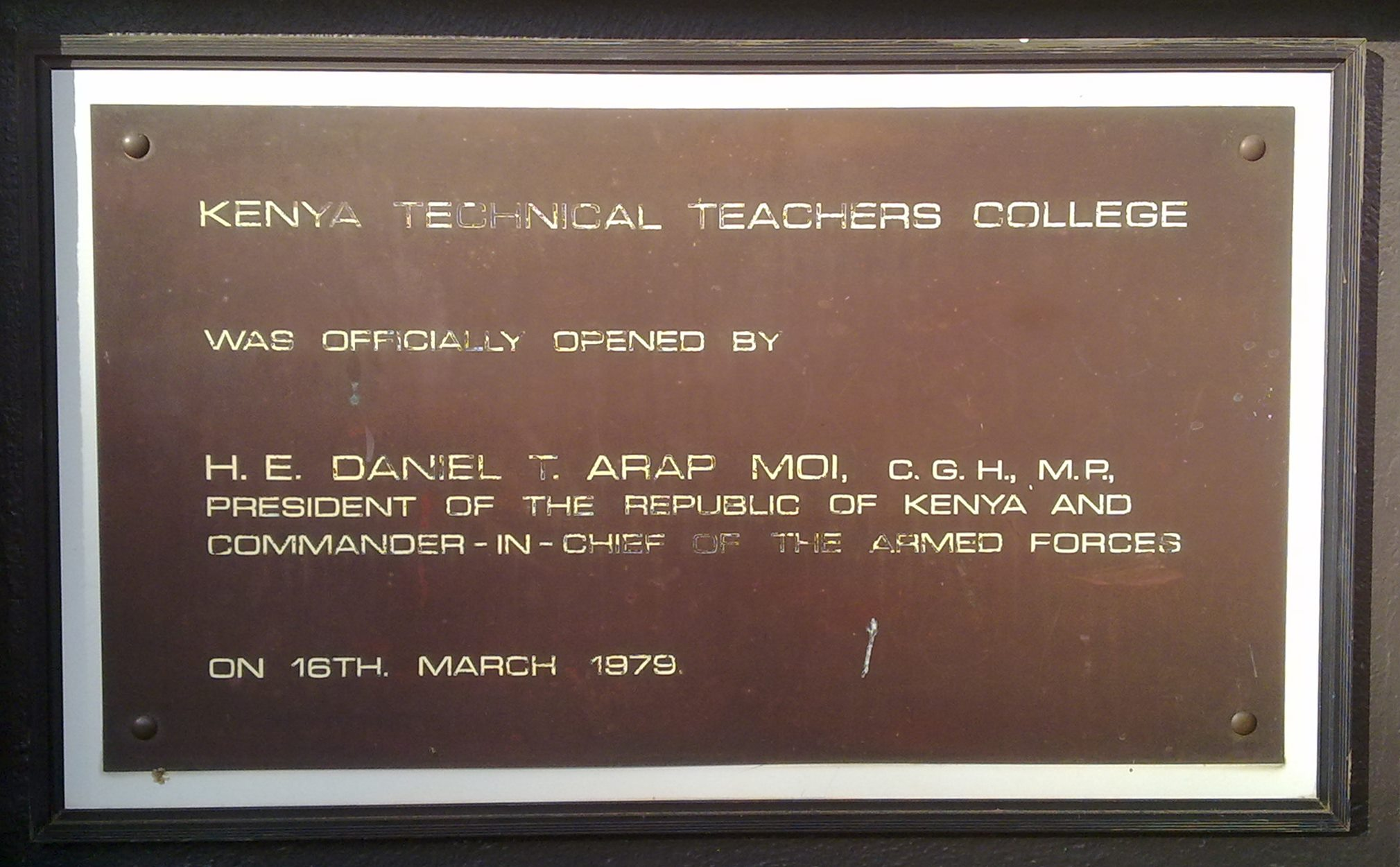
A plaque marking the college unveiling on Friday 16 March 1979 by the then President of the Republic of Kenya Daniel Toroitich Arap Moi (Click to enlarge / read.)

Kenya Technical Trainers College is located in the Gigiri area of Nairobi, along Limuru Road and next to the United Nations Office. A controversial proposal by the Government of Kenya would relocate the college to the Kenya Science Campus of University of Nairobi.

== Teacher education programs ==
=== Certificate courses ===
- Instructor Training Part I
- Instructor Training part II
- Certificate in Management of TVET institution
- Training of Trainers courses

=== Diploma courses ===
- Diploma in Technical Teacher Education (mathematics/business studies)
- Diploma in Technical Teacher Education(Mixed-mode)
- Diploma in Technical Teacher Education with ICT
- Diploma in Instructor Training
- Diploma in Technical Teacher Education (rMechanical Engineering) Pre-service

=== Higher and advanced diploma courses ===
- Higher Diploma in Education Management (KNEC)
- Advanced Diploma in Technical Education

== Non-teacher education programs ==
All non-teacher education programs were suspended as from 2020

=== Student body ===
The student body, represented by the Students of Kenya Technical Trainers College Organisation (SKETTCO). In 2018, John Koech received re-election as finance minister of the SKETTCO. The college also has a body of student's representatives (SRC)-Student representative council, headed by Edwin Segera in 2020, some of the members of SRC(2020) include John Kairegi, Benjami Africa, Douglas Juma, Lawrence Karanja Muturi, Brilliant Kibende, Sharon Moenga ...

== See also ==
- List of universities and colleges in Kenya
