= Anthony Keck =

Anthony Keck may refer to:

- Anthony Keck (architect) (1726–1797), English architect
- Sir Anthony Keck (Tiverton MP) (1630–1695), British lawyer and politician, MP for Tiverton 1691–95
- Anthony James Keck (1740–1782), English politician, MP for Leicester 1755–56, for Newton 1768–74
- Anthony Keck (Woodstock MP), MP for Woodstock 1753-67
