= Matunda =

Town in Uasin Gishu County of Kenya

- Town
- Location within Kenya
- Coordinates: 00°49′41″N 35°07′17″E
- Country: Kenya
- County: Uasin Gishu
- Sub-County: Soy
- Elevation: 1,841 m (6,040 ft)

Population (2019)
  - Total: 10,807
- Time zone: UTC+3 (EAT)
- Postal code: 30205

Matunda is a town in Soy Sub-county, Uasin Gishu County, Kenya. As of the year 2019, there were about 10,807 inhabitants within the boundaries of Matunda. Its name means "fruits" in Swahili.

== Geography ==
Matunda is situated on the western edge of the Soy Sub-county, on the northwestern part of Uasin Gishu. It has an average elevation of 1,841 metres above sea level. The Eldoret-Kitale Road runs north–south through the town.
