= Turbo Constituency =

Electoral constituency in Kenya

Turbo
- constituency for the Parliament of Kenya
- Turbo Constituency within Uasin Gishu County

- Uasin Gishu County within Kenya
- County: Uasin Gishu
- Population: 267,273
- Area: 431 km^{2} (166.4 sq mi)

Current constituency
- Number of members: 1
- Party: UDA
- Member of Parliament: Janet Jepkemboi Sitienei
- Wards: 6

Turbo is a constituency in Kenya and one of six constituencies in Uasin Gishu County.

In 2017 Janet Jepkemboi Sitienei was elected to parliament as Member of parliament for Turbo constituency after defeating the strong Jubilee candidate Kevin Okwara.
