= Kech, Khyber Pakhtunkhwa =

Coordinates: 32°5′30″N 70°52′55″E

Kech کیچ
- Town and union council
- Interactive map of Kech کیچ
- Country: Pakistan
- Province: Khyber-Pakhtunkhwa
- District: Dera Ismail Khan District
- Time zone: UTC+5 (PST)

Kech (Urdu: کیچ) is a town and union council in Dera Ismail Khan District of Khyber-Pakhtunkhwa. It is located at 32°5'30N 70°52'55E and has an altitude of 188 metres (620 feet).
