= Fred Keck =

American politician

Frederick Keck (June 26, 1854–November 8, 1913) was an American farmer and politician.

Keck was born in Stookey Township, St. Clair County, Illinois. He lived in Belleville, Illinois and was a farmer. Keck served in the Illinois House of Representatives from 1905 to 1911 and again in 1913 when he died suddenly. Keck was a Republican. Keck died suddenly from heart failure in Belleville, Illinois while doing yard work at his home.
