= Kenya National Bureau of Statistics =

Kenya's principal government institution in charge of statistics and census data

Agency overview
- Formed: February 1, 2007; 19 years ago
- Preceding agency: Central Bureau of Statistics
- Jurisdiction: Government of Kenya
- Headquarters: Real Towers, Nairobi, Kenya
- Agency executives: Benjamin Avusevwa, Acting Director-General; Dr. Daniel Mwirigi M’Amanja, Chairperson of the Board
- Parent agency: National Treasury and Economic Planning
- Website: knbs.or.ke

Footnotes
- Established under the Statistics Act, 2006.

The Kenya National Bureau of Statistics (KNBS) is a department in Kenya's Ministry of Planning which collects and compiles regular cross-sectoral data for the government. The Bureau was established through the Statistics Act of 2006 and initiated in February 2007. The office places staffs in other departments of the Kenyan Government to collect data. The headquarters are in Herufi House in Nairobi.

== Programmes ==
=== Kenya Population and Housing Census ===
In part, the National Bureau of Statistics oversees the Kenya Population and Housing Census, which occurs every ten years. The most recent census was in 2019, and documents the population of country. An audit by the Auditor General's office published in 2021 found that half of the KSh 18.5 billion budget of the Kenya Population and Housing Census for the 2019 census, could not be accounted for.

=== National Sampling Survey and Evaluation Programme ===
The National Sampling Survey and Evaluation Programme is a household data collection program.

== See also ==
- 2019 Kenya Population and Housing Census
