= Soy Constituency =

Electoral constituency in Kenya

Soy
- constituency for the Parliament of Kenya
- Soy Constituency within Uasin Gishu County

- Uasin Gishu County within Kenya
- County: Uasin Gishu
- Population: 229,094
- Area: 668 km^{2} (257.9 sq mi)

Current constituency
- Number of members: 1
- Party: UDA
- Member of Parliament: David Kiplagat
- Wards: 7

Soy is a constituency in Kenya, one of six constituencies in Uasin Gishu County.

The name is derived from the Kalenjin word Soin meaning hot.
