= Sandra Keck =

Sandra Keck (born 8 October 1967 in Cuxhaven, Germany) is a German singer, director, actor and author.

== Career ==
Sandra Keck made her first stage experiences from 1982 together with her brother Florian in Rolf Zuckowski's show Rolf und seine Freunde. She has been an actress at the Ohnsorg-Theater since 27 May 1990 and has played alongside well-known actors such as Heidi Kabel, Jürgen Pooch, Ursula Hinrichs and Uwe Friedrichsen.

In 1996, she founded the Pyrmonter Theater Companie with several fellow actors.

She directed her first play in 1999 with the fairy tale Der Räuber Hotzenplotz. Sandra Keck made a name for herself as an author with the musical Wi rockt op platt, which she wrote for the Ohnsorg Theater's anniversary season in 2002/03 and which was performed at the theater and on tour from 28 September 2002 to June 2009.

Since Keck did not agree with the modernization course of the artistic director Michael Lang, who was appointed in 2017, she left the permanent ensemble of the Ohnsorg Theatre. Some of the staff shared her criticism of the theater's changed orientation towards more High German and modern plays. In May 2023, she was elected by the Niederdeutsche Bühne association, owner of the theater, as chairwoman of the association and thus chairwoman of the supervisory board of Ohnsorg-Theater GmbH. This led to the resignation of supporters of the modernization course, including the artistic director Murat Yeginer.

== Radio plays (selection) ==
- 2006: Dylan Thomas: Ünner den Melkwoold (Rosi Pröve/Janne Hoosband) – Edited and directed by Hans Helge Ott (Original radio play – RB/NDR)
- 2019–2023: Seker is seker (various authors) – Edited and directed by Ilka Bartels (Original radio play, series, 20 episodes – RB/NDR)

== Works ==
- Lees mol'n beten ... Keck!', Verlag Michael Jung, Kiel 2009, ISBN 978-3-89882-104-9
- Ganz schöön ... Keck!, Verlag Michael Jung, Kiel 2011, ISBN 978-3-89882-121-6
- Steerns an'n Heven. Wiehnachten in uns Tiet; ed.: Gesche Scheller, authors: Ines Barber, Yared Dibaba, Marianne Ehlers, Sandra Keck, Matthias Stührwoldt, Heike Thode-Scheel, Petra Wede and Detlef Wutschik, Quickborn-Verlag, Hamburg 2016, ISBN 978-3-87651-435-2

== Awards ==
- 2008 Niederdeutscher Literaturpreis der Stadt Kappeln
- 2008 Ohnsorg-Verdienstmedaille der Stiftung zur Förderung des Ohnsorg-Theaters
- 2014 Harburger Musikpreis des Helms-Museum for her services to the cultivation and dissemination of Low German music
- 2014 Rolf Mares Prize for her role as Johanna Homann in Lengen na Leev at the Ohnsorg Theater
