= Samuel Chepkonga =

Kenyan politician

Samuel Chepkonga is a Kenyan politician from the United Democratic Alliance who has been member of the National Assembly for the Ainabkoi constituency since 2022.

He was elected MP for Ainabkoi constituency in 2013 from the United Republican Party.

== See also ==
- 11th Parliament of Kenya
- 13th Parliament of Kenya
