= Timau =

Timau can refer to:

- Timau, in Meru, Kenya
- Timau, the Friulian name for Timavo
- Timau, a frazione of Paluzza, Italy
