= Majengo =

Majengo may refer to:

- Majengo (Mbeya ward), in Mbeya Region, Tanzania
- Majengo (Dodoma ward), in Dodoma Region, Tanzania
- Majengo (Singida Urban), in Singida Urban region, Tanzania
- Majengo (Moshi Urban ward), in Kilimanjaro Region, Tanzania
- Majengo, Mombasa, a suburb of Mombasa, Kenya
- Majengo, Nairobi, a suburb of Nairobi, Kenya
