= Matuu =

Polynesian god of the north wind

In Polynesian mythology, Matuu or Matu is the god of the north wind and the second wind to be controlled by Maui.
