= Sindo Department =

Sindo
- Department
- Interactive map of Sindo
- Country: Burkina Faso
- Region: Sud-Ouest
- Province: Kénédougou
- Time zone: UTC+0 (GMT 0)

Sindo is a department or commune of Kénédougou Province in Burkina Faso.
