= Kimana =

Place in Rift Valley Province, Kenya

- Country: Kenya
- Province: Rift Valley Province

Population (2011)
  - Total: Estimated 783
- Time zone: UTC+3 (EAT)

Kimana is small town in Kajiado South Constituency, Kenya. Kimana is located in the Loitokitok District with Tanzania to the west, the Kajiado District to the north, Kibwezi District to the East and Taveta District to the south. Agriculture is difficult due to the semi-arid climate. Kimana has a Public Health Centre that offers basic health treatments such as pharmaceuticals and medical consultancy. There is also a small c that offers rented tents for tourists visiting on Safari.
