= Elisha Tanui =

Kenyan marathon runner

Elisha Kipkoech Tanui-Tultul (born September 16, 1983, in Kipsangui, Uasin Gishu County, Eldoret, Kenya) is a world-class runner at distance ranging from 1500 meters (PR 3:48) to the 24-hour ultra-marathon (137 miles).

He was the first Kenyan athlete to run more than 100 miles in one day, covering 139 miles at UltraCentric 2008 Dallas Texas, USA. His best times are 14:25 at 5K, 29:06 at 10K, half marathon in 64:59, and marathon in 2:14:16. His dream is to run and win the 2012 Boston Marathon.
