= Uasin Gishu County =

County of Rift Valley Province, Kenya

Coordinates: 0.516667°N 35.2833°E

- County
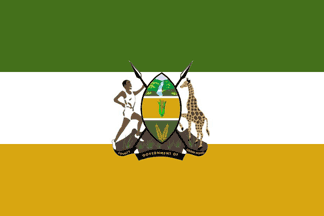
- Flag

- Location in Kenya
- Country: Kenya
- Formed: 4 March 2013
- Capital: Eldoret

Government
  - Governor: Jonathan Bii

Area
  - Total: 2,955.3 km^{2} (1,141.0 sq mi)
- Elevation: 2,200 m (7,200 ft)

Population (2019)
  - Total: 1,163,186
  - Density: 393.59/km^{2} (1,019.4/sq mi)

GDP (PPP)
  - GDP: ▲$6.833 billion (8th)(2022)
  - Per Capita: ▲$5,582 (2022) (15th)

GDP (NOMINAL)
  - GDP: ▲$2.527 billion (2022) (8th)
  - Per Capita: ▲$2,050 (2022) (14th)
- Time zone: UTC+3 (EAT)
- Website: www.uasingishu.go.ke

Uasin Gishu County is one of the 47 counties of Kenya, located in the former Rift Valley Province. Eldoret city has the county's largest population centre as well as its administrative and commercial centre. It is bordered by Elgeyo-Marakwet to the East, Trans Nzoia to the North, Kakamega to the west, Nandi and Kericho to the South West and Baringo to the South East. It is a highland plateau with altitudes falling gently from 2,700 metres (8,900 ft) above sea level to about 1,500 metres (4,900 ft) above sea level. The topography is higher to the east and declines gently towards the western border".

Uasin Gishu is located on a plateau and has a cool and temperate climate. The county borders Trans-Nzoia County to the north, Elgeyo-Marakwet and Baringo counties to the east, Kericho County to the south, Nandi County to the south and south-west and Kakamega County to the west.

== Etymology ==
The county is named after Illwuasin-kishu, a Maasai clan. The land was the grazing area of the clan. They surrendered the land to the colonial government in the Anglo-Maasai agreement of 1911 and were subsequently pushed towards Trans Mara District. The plateau that they once occupied was then registered in its Anglicised version, Uasin Gishu.

== History ==
In 1903, it was proposed to use the area as a Jewish homeland; British Uganda Programme, which was rejected by the Jewish community leaders in the Seventh Zionist Congress (1905).

In 1908, fifty-eight families of Afrikaans-speaking South Africans settled in the Uasin Gishu plateau. They were followed by sixty more families in 1911 and more later. The town of Eldoret was established in the midst of the farms they created.

== Population ==
Historical population
Year	Pop.	±%
1979	300,766	—
1989	445,530	+48.1%
1999	622,705	+39.8%
2009	894,179	+43.6%
2019	1,163,186	+30.1%

=== Religion ===
Religion (2019 Census)	Number
Protestant	521,093
Roman Catholic	250,572
Evangelical Churches	222,364
African instituted Churches	68,784
Orthodox	3,537
Other Christian	39,428
Islam	18,805
Hindu	1,600
Traditionists	1,193
Other	9,523
No ReligionAtheists	14,289
Don't Know	1,362
Not Stated	121

== Government ==
=== Urban areas ===
Town	Type	Population (2009)	Rank in Kenya (Population Size)
Eldoret	Municipality	289,380	5
Moi's Bridge	Town	14,596	106
Matunda	Town	10,031	119
Burnt Forest	Town	4,925	172
Jua Kali	Town	3,427	192
Turbo	Town	2,831	201

=== Constituencies ===
Division	Population*	Urban pop.*	Headquarters
Ainabkoi Constituency	77,290	18,799	Kapsoya
Kapseret Constituency	93,162	55,056	Kapseret
Kesses Constituency	84,894	0	Kesses
Moiben Constituency	92,717	6,172	Moiben
Soy Constituency	165,127	46,338	Eldoret
Turbo Constituency	109,508	46,900	Turbo
* 1999 census.

== Uasin Gishu Sub-counties ==
Uasin Gishu is divided into six sub-counties namely: Turbo - with a Total of six wards; Kesses - With a Total of four wards; Moiben - With a Total of Five wards; Kapseret - with a total of five wards; Ainabkoi -with a total of three wards; and Soy - With a Total of Seven wards. The sub-counties boundaries also correspond with the electoral constituencies in the counties.

Uasin Gishu Sub Counties
Sub County	Wards	Sub County	Wards	Sub County	Wards
Turbo	Huruma	Moiben	Karuna/Meibeki	Soy	Kipsomba
Turbo	Kamagut	Moiben	Kimumu	Soy	Kunet/Kapsuswa
Turbo	Kapsaos	Moiben	Moiben	Soy	Soy
Turbo	Kiplombe	Moiben	Sergoit	Soy	Ziwa
Turbo	Ngenyilel	Moiben	Tembelio	Soy	Kapkures
Turbo	Tapsagoi	Moiben		Soy	Mois Bridge
Turbo		Moiben		Soy	Segero/Barsombe
Kesses	Tulwet/Chuiyat	Kapseret	Ngeria	Ainabkoi	Ainabkoi/Olare
Kesses	Tarakwa	Kapseret	Simat/Kapseret	Ainabkoi	Kaptagat
Kesses	Cheptiret/Kipchamo	Kapseret	Kipkenyo	Ainabkoi	Kapsoya
Kesses	Racecourse	Kapseret	Langas	Ainabkoi	
Kesses		Kapseret	Megun	Ainabkoi	

Each Sub County has an administrative office in charge of it from the county Government. Wards administrators are in charge of wards and Sub County administrators admin the sub Counties.

== Economy ==
Uasin Gishu is the 8th Largest Economy in Kenya with a GDP of $6.8B at PPP and $2.5B at Nominal. It is the 11th richest County in Africa with a GDP per Capita of $2,050.

=== Agriculture ===
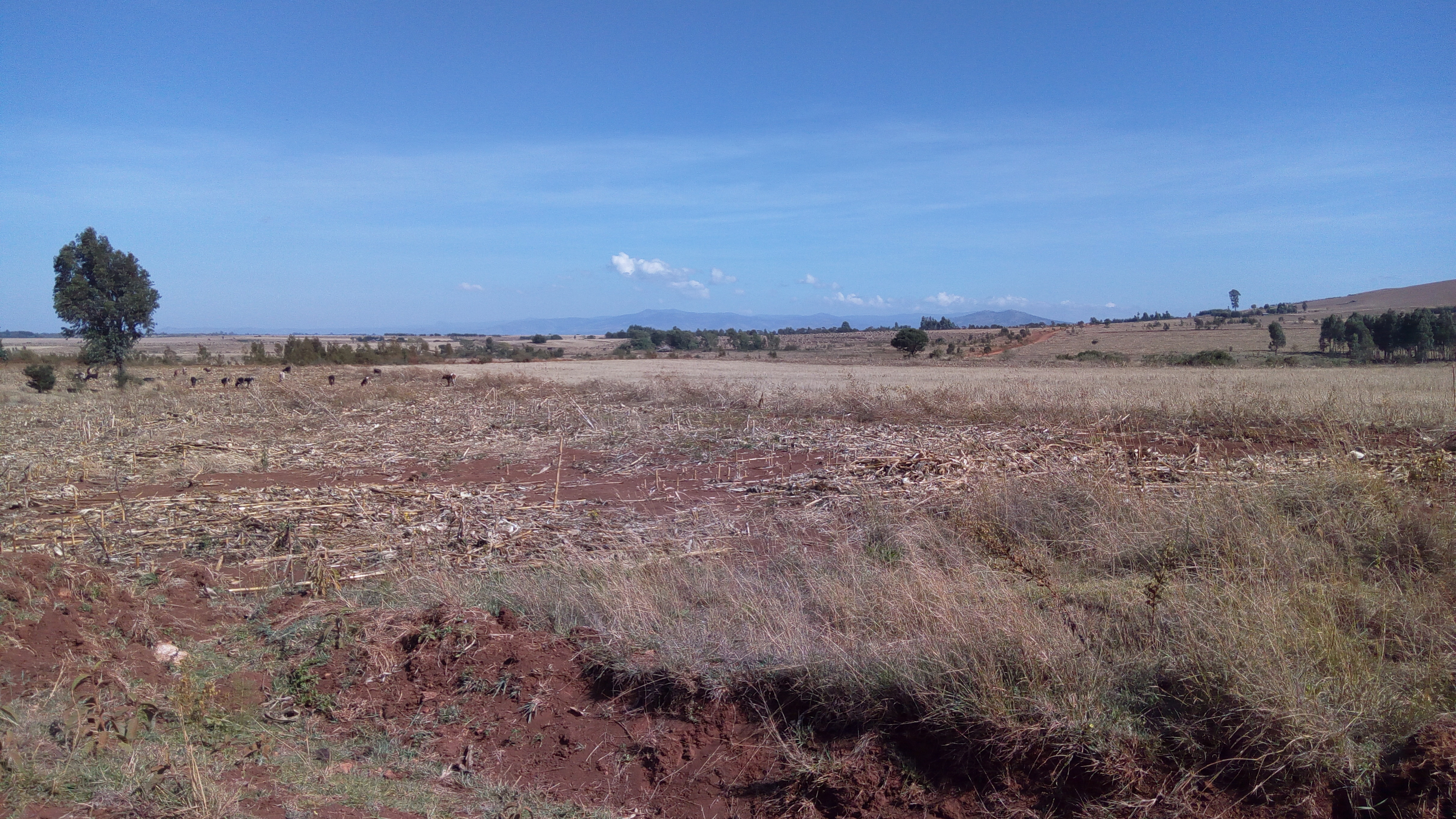
Cherangani hills as viewed from farmlands near Karuna, Moiben, Uasin Gishu

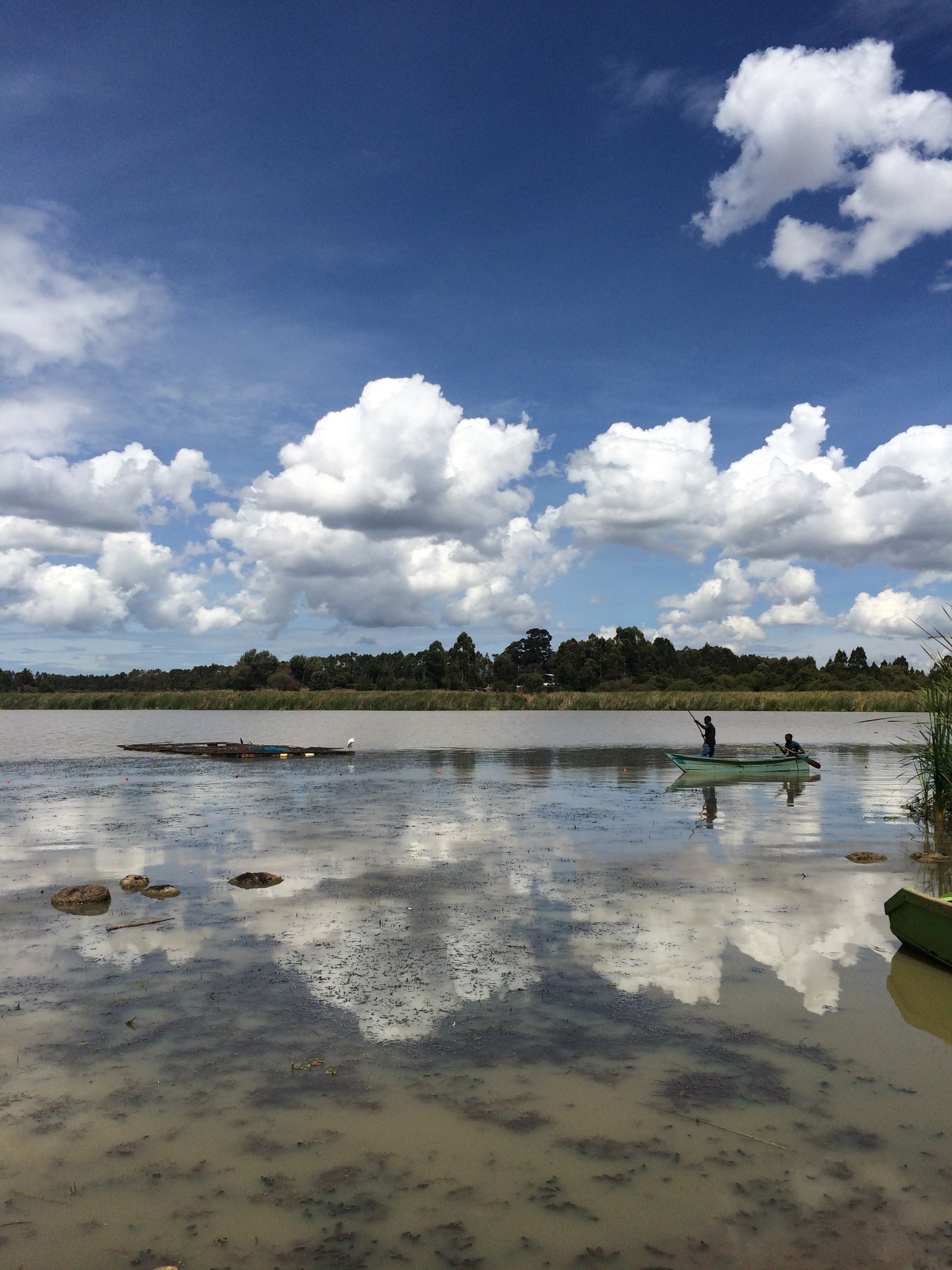
Kesses Reservoir

Uasin Gishu along with neighbouring Trans-Nzoia, are considered Kenya's breadbasket due to their large-scale maize and wheat farms which produce the bulk of the country's total harvest.

The National Cereals Board has a cereal storage depot located at Moi's Bridge town located in the north of the county, which consists of eight large silos with a capacity of approximately 5 million tonnes of grain. It is one of the largest in the country and plays a significant role in Kenya's food security.

The county also produces sizable quantities of milk and horticultural produce, with a wide variety of crops and animals produced in smaller quantities.

=== Aquaculture ===
The county has 1,728 operational fish ponds covering 486,000 m^{2} with annual fish production of 593,000 kg worth KShs 285,900,000. The county also has many private and public dams suitable for capture fisheries with an annual production of 33,048 kg worth KShs 9,914,400.

=== Industry ===
The county capital, Eldoret, is home to a textile industry as well as East Africa's only manufacturer of small arms and ammunition. There is also a substantial agribusiness sector that makes use of the produce from the county and surrounding regions.

=== Services ===
Eldoret is a major commercial centre in western Kenya. Service industries like wholesale & retail trade, auto repair, entertainment centres and various IT services abound within and outside the town. Almost all Kenyan banks have a presence in the town and these act to service the region.

==== Tourism ====
Tourism, sports tourism in particular, is a growing sub-sector in the county - the result of long term performances by athletes from the region.

== Transport ==
Uasin Gishu has 300 kilometres (190 mi) of tarmac roads, 549 kilometres (341 mi) of murram roads and 377 kilometres (234 mi) of earth roads. It also has 17 kilometres (11 mi) of railway line with 8 railway stations in addition to an inland container depot. The Eldoret International Airport and two airstrips are also located in the county, all combining to make it the regions service hub.

== Education ==
The county has several universities including Moi University and the University of Eldoret, which have their main campuses in the county. Several technical and vocational institutes are also located in the county, including Eldoret National Polytechnic, Rift Valley Technical Training Institute, Kipkabus Technical and Vocational College, Moiben Technical and Vocational College, Kosyin Technical Training Institute, Chebororwa Agricultural Training Centre, Tumaini and Technical Training Institute, Eldoret Technical training institute Kenya School of TVET (Moiben Campus), amongst others.

== Notable people ==
- Philip Boit (born 1971), cross-country skier
- Rachel Ruto (born 1968), First lady of Kenya
- William Ruto (born 1966), 5th president of Kenya
- Sabastian Sawe (born 1995), world-class distance runner
- Elisha Tanui (born 1983), world-class distance runner
