= Railway stations in Kenya =

Railway stations in Kenya include:

== Maps ==
- UN Map
- UNHCR Atlas Map
- Prondis Map
- Railway Gazette International June 2012, p31
- KRC Map

== Gauge ==
The gauge of the main Kenya railway is being replaced by a standard gauge (1435mm) line. The continuation to Uganda is on metre gauge (1000mm).

== Towns served by metre gauge railways ==
- Mombasa - Indian Ocean port
- Changamwe
- Miritini
- Mazeras
- Mariakani
- Maji ya Chumvi
- Samburu
- Taru
- Mackinnon Road
- Mwanatibu
- Buchuma
- Wangala
- Maungu
- Ndara
- Voi - junction
  - Mwatate
  - Bura
  - Mashoti
  - Maktau
  - Murka
  - Ziwani
  - Taveta - across Tanzania border from Moshi
- Irima
- Ndi
- Manyani
- Tsavo
- Kyulu
- Kenani
- Kanga
- Mtito Andei
- Kathekani
- Darajani
- Ngwata
- Masongaleni
- Kikumbulyu
- Kibwezi
- Mbuinzau
- Makindu
- Ikoyo
- Kiboko
- Simba
- Kabati
- Emali
- Nzai
- Sultan Hamud
- Kima
- Kalembwani
- Kiu
- Ulu
- Konza - junction for Magadi
  - Kajiado
  - Kenya Marble Quarry
  - Elangata Wuas
  - Singiraini
  - Koora
  - Magadi - soda factory, operated by Magadi Soda Company
- Kapiti Plains Estate
- Stony Athi
- Lukenya
- Athi River (Mavoko)
- Marimbeti
- Embakasi
- Makadara
- Makongeni
- Nairobi - national capital and junction for Nanyuki
  - Dandora
  - Githurai
  - Kahawa
  - Ruiru
  - Kalimoni (Juja)
  - Komo
  - Thika
  - Mitubiri
  - Santamor
  - Makuyu
  - Saba Saba
  - Maragua
  - Murang'a
  - Sagana
  - Makaungu
  - Karatina
  - Nyeri
  - Naro Moru
  - Nanyuki - branch terminus
- Kibera
- Dagoretti
- Kikuyu
- Muguga
- Limuru
- Uplands (Lari)
- Matathia
- Kijabe
- Longonot
- Suswa
- Munyu
- Naivasha
- Morendat
- Ilkek
- Gilgil - junction for Nyahururu
  - Oleolondo
  - Ol Kalou
  - Nyahururu - branch terminus
- Kariandusi
- Mbaruk
- Lanet
- Nakuru

- Menengai
- Rongai
- Visoi
- Esageri
- Sabatia
- Maji Mazuri
- Makutano
- Equator
- Timboroa
- Ainakboi
- Tumeiyo
- Kipkabus
- Kaptagat
- Cheploske
- Plateau
- Sosian
- Eldoret - junction for Kitale
  - Soy
  - Springfield Halt
  - Moi's Bridge
  - Kitale - branch terminus
- Leseru
- Turbo
- Kipkarren
- Lugari
- Webuye
- Mulukbu
- Bungoma
- Mateka
- Myanga
- Kimaeti
- Malaba, Kenya
  - (Kenya) (Uganda)
- Malaba, Uganda
- Tororo, Uganda

- Rongai proposed junction for Sudan; junction for Solai
  - Kampi ya Moto
  - Olabanaita
  - Solai - branch terminus

=== Branches ===
- Nakuru - junction for Kisumu
  - Njoro
  - Elburgon
  - Turi
  - Molo
  - Mau Summit
  - Londiani
  - Kedowa
  - Lumbwa
  - Kipkelion
  - Tunnel
  - Fort Ternan
  - Koru
  - Muhoroni
  - Chemelil
  - Kibigori
  - Miwani
  - Kibos
  - Kisumu - inland port on Lake Victoria
    - Kisian
    - Lela
    - Maseno
    - Luanda
    - Yala
    - Namasoli
    - Butere - branch terminus

== Towns served by Standard Gauge Railway ==
- Mombasa
- Mariakani
- Voi
- Miasenyi
- Mtito Andei
- Kibwezi
- Emali
- Athi River
- Nairobi
- Ongata Rongai
- Ngong
- Mai Mahiu
- Suswa

LAPSSET

- Lamu - port
- Ijara
- Garissa
- Isiolo - junction
- Lodwar
- Nakodok
- (South Sudan) Kenya-Ethiopia border
- Isiolo - junction
- Marsabit
- Moyale
- (Ethiopia) Kenya-South Sudan border
- Nairobi - junction
- Embu
- Isiolo - junction

== Picture gallery ==
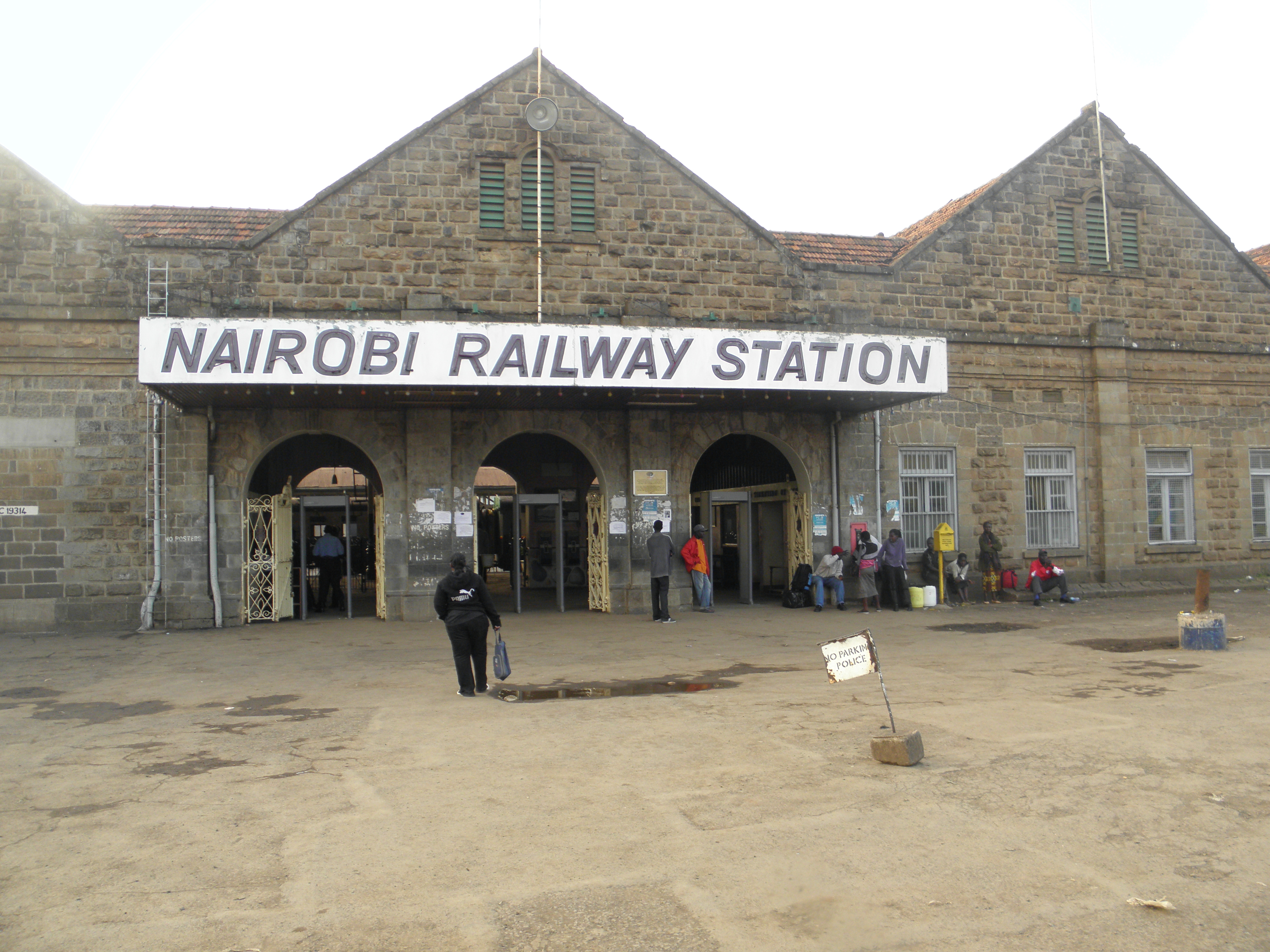
Old Nairobi railway station

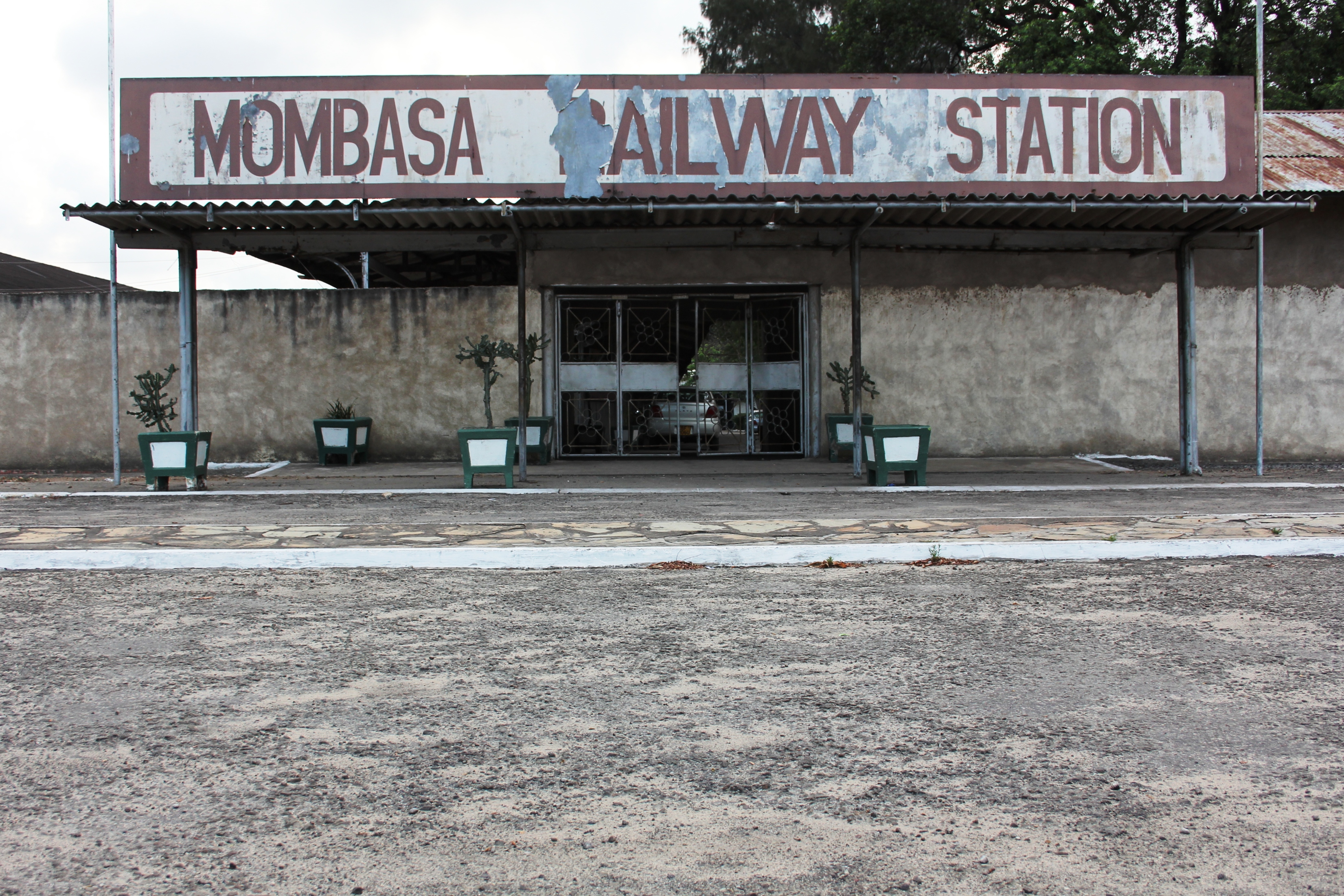
Old Mombasa railway station

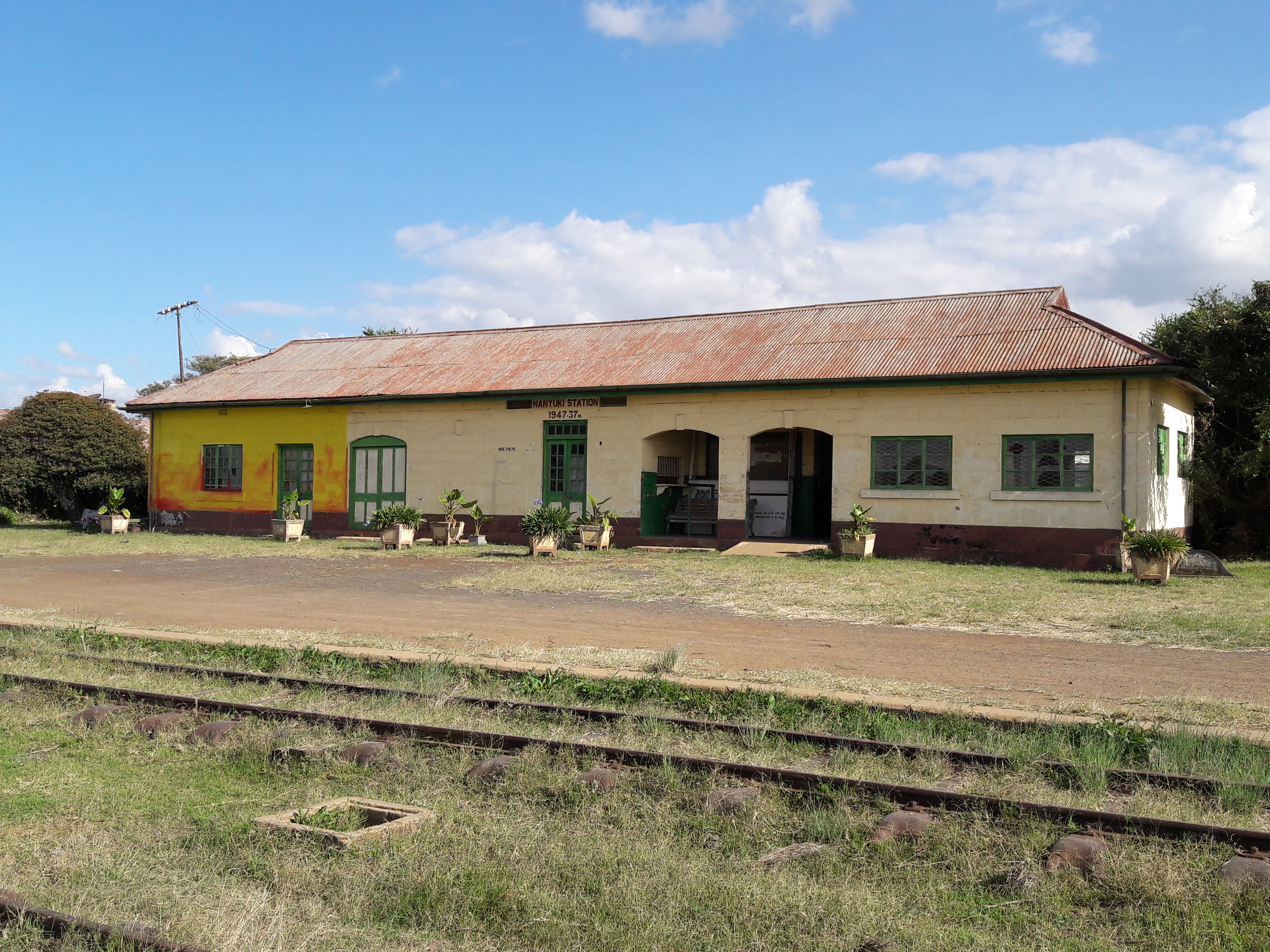
Old Nanyuki railway station

== See also ==
- Transport in Kenya
- Rail transport in Kenya
- Railway stations in Uganda
- Railway stations in Tanzania
- Railway stations in Rwanda
- Railway stations in Burundi
- Railway stations in South Sudan
- Lamu Port and Lamu-Southern Sudan-Ethiopia Transport Corridor
