= Obsidian =

Naturally occurring volcanic glass

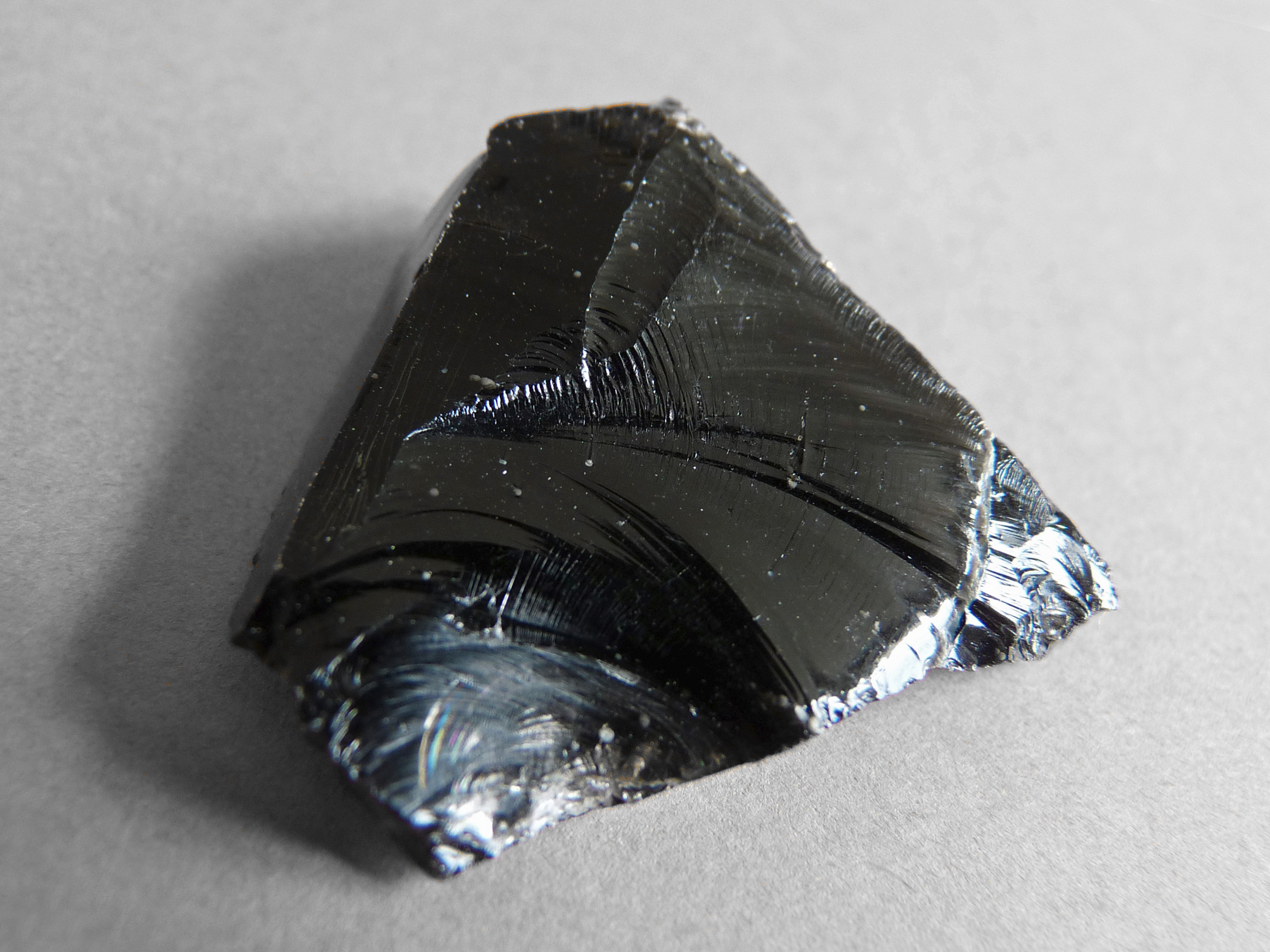

General
- Category: Volcanic glass

Identification
- Color: usually black; sometimes green or brown; rarely yellow, orange, red or blue
- Fracture: Conchoidal
- Mohs scale hardness: 5–6
- Luster: Vitreous
- Specific gravity: c. 2.4
- Optical properties: Translucent
- Melting point: 700–1,050 °C (1,292–1,922 °F)
- Other characteristics: Texture: Smooth; glassy

Obsidian (/əb.ˈsɪd.i.ən, ɒb.-/, əb-SID-ee-ən ob-) is a naturally occurring volcanic glass formed when lava extruded from a volcano cools rapidly with minimal crystal growth. It is an igneous rock. Produced from felsic lava, obsidian is rich in the lighter elements such as silicon, oxygen, aluminium, sodium, and potassium. It is commonly found within the margins of rhyolitic lava flows known as obsidian flows. These flows have a high content of silica, giving them a high viscosity. The high viscosity inhibits the diffusion of atoms through the lava, which inhibits the first step (nucleation) in the formation of mineral crystals. Together with rapid cooling, this results in a natural glass forming from the lava.

Obsidian is hard, brittle, and amorphous; it therefore fractures with very sharp edges. In the past, it was used to manufacture cutting and piercing tools, and it has been used experimentally as surgical scalpel blades.

== Origin and properties ==
The Natural History by the Roman writer Pliny the Elder includes a few sentences about a volcanic glass called obsidian (lapis obsidianus), discovered in Ethiopia by Obsidius, a Roman explorer.

Obsidian is formed from quickly cooled lava. Extrusive formation of obsidian may occur when felsic lava cools rapidly at the edges of a felsic lava flow or volcanic dome, or when lava cools during sudden contact with water or air. Intrusive formation of obsidian may occur when felsic lava cools along the edges of a dike.

Tektites were once thought by many to be obsidian produced by lunar volcanic eruptions, though few scientists now adhere to this hypothesis.

Obsidian is mineral-like, but not a true mineral because, as a glass, it is not crystalline; in addition, its composition is too variable to be classified as a mineral. It is sometimes classified as a mineraloid. Though obsidian is usually dark in color, similar to mafic rocks such as basalt, the composition of obsidian is extremely felsic. Obsidian consists mainly of SiO_{2} (silicon dioxide), usually 70% by weight or more; the remainder consists of variable amounts of other oxides, mostly oxides of aluminium, iron, potassium, sodium and calcium. Crystalline rocks with a similar composition include granite and rhyolite. Because obsidian is metastable at the Earth's surface (over time the glass devitrifies, becoming fine-grained mineral crystals), obsidian older than Miocene in age is rare. Exceptionally old obsidians include a Cretaceous welded tuff and a partially devitrified Ordovician perlite. This transformation of obsidian is accelerated by the presence of water. Although newly formed obsidian has a low water content, typically less than 1% water by weight, it becomes progressively hydrated when exposed to groundwater, forming perlite.

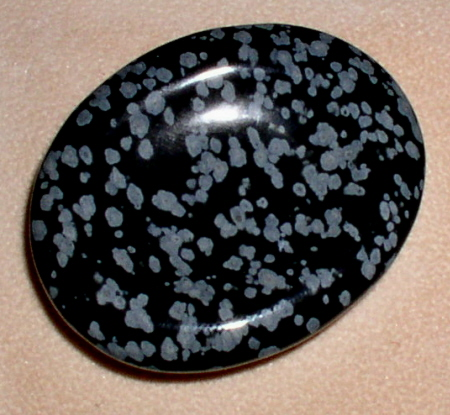
Polished snowflake obsidian, formed through the inclusion of cristobalite crystals

Pure obsidian is usually dark in appearance, though the color varies depending on the impurities present. Iron and other transition elements may give the obsidian a dark brown to black color. Most black obsidians contain nanoinclusions of magnetite, an iron oxide. Very few samples of obsidian are nearly colorless. In some stones, the inclusion of small, white, radially clustered crystals (spherulites) of the mineral cristobalite in the black glass produce a blotchy or snowflake pattern (snowflake obsidian). Obsidian may contain patterns of gas bubbles remaining from the lava flow, aligned along layers created as the molten rock was flowing before being cooled. These bubbles can produce interesting effects such as a golden sheen (sheen obsidian). An iridescent, rainbow-like sheen (fire obsidian) is caused by inclusions of magnetite nanoparticles creating thin-film interference. Colorful, striped obsidian (rainbow obsidian) from Mexico contains oriented nanorods of hedenbergite, which cause the rainbow striping effects by thin-film interference.

== Occurrence ==
Obsidian is found near volcanoes in locations which have undergone rhyolitic eruptions. It can be found in Argentina, Armenia, Azerbaijan, Australia, Canada, Chile, Georgia, Ecuador, El Salvador, Greece, Guatemala, Hungary, Iceland, Indonesia, Italy, Japan, Kenya, Mexico, New Zealand, Papua New Guinea, Peru, Russia, Scotland, the Canary Islands, Turkey and the United States. Obsidian flows which are so large that they can be hiked on are found within the calderas of Newberry Volcano (Big Obsidian Flow, 700 acres) and Medicine Lake Volcano in the Cascade Range of western North America, and at Inyo Craters east of the Sierra Nevada in California. Yellowstone National Park has a mountainside containing obsidian located between Mammoth Hot Springs and the Norris Geyser Basin, and deposits can be found in many other western U.S. states including Arizona, Colorado, New Mexico, Texas, Utah, and Washington, Oregon and Idaho.

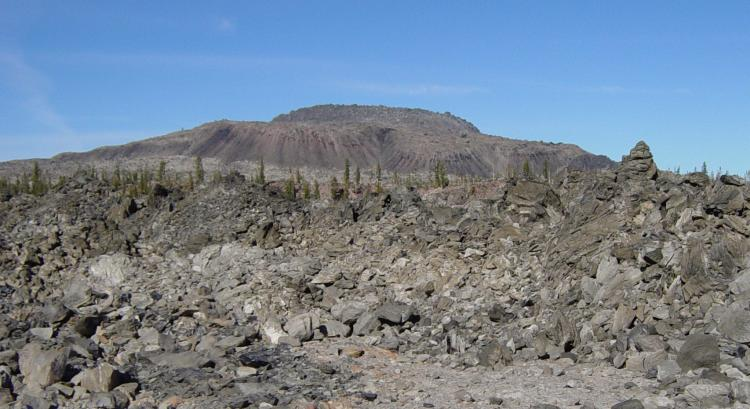
Glass Mountain, a large obsidian flow at Medicine Lake Volcano in California

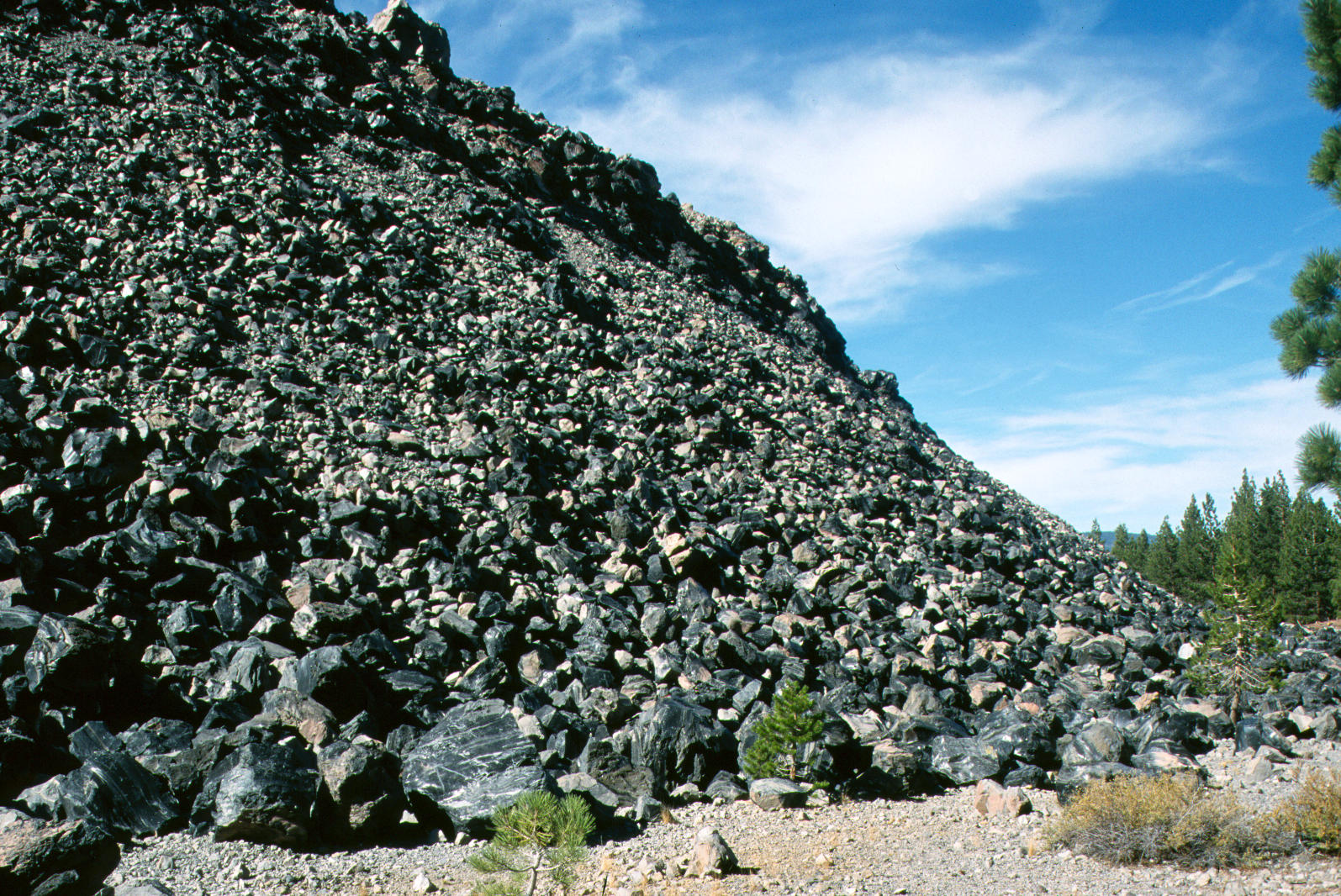
Jumble of pumice and volcanic obsidian, Obsidian Dome, California

There are four major deposit areas in the central Mediterranean: Lipari, Pantelleria, Palmarola and Monte Arci (Sardinia).

Ancient sources in the Aegean were Milos and Gyali.

Acıgöl town and the Göllü Dağ volcano were the most important sources in central Anatolia, one of the more important source areas in the prehistoric Near East.

== Prehistoric and historical use ==
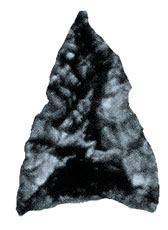
Obsidian arrowhead

The first known archaeological evidence of usage was in Kariandusi (Kenya) and other sites of the Acheulian age (beginning 1.5 million years BP) dated 700,000 BC, although only very few objects have been found at these sites relative to the Neolithic. Manufacture of obsidian bladelets at Lipari had reached a high level of sophistication by the late Neolithic, and was traded as far as Sicily, the southern Po river valley, and Croatia. Obsidian bladelets were used in ritual circumcisions and cutting of umbilical cords of newborns. Anatolian sources of obsidian are known to have been the material used in the Levant and modern-day Iraqi Kurdistan from a time beginning sometime about 12,500 BC. Obsidian artifacts are common at Tell Brak, one of the earliest Mesopotamian urban centers, dating to the late fifth millennium BC. Obsidian was valued in Stone Age cultures because, like flint, it could be fractured to produce sharp blades or arrowheads in a process called knapping. Like all glass and some other naturally occurring rocks, obsidian breaks with a characteristic conchoidal fracture. It was also polished to create early mirrors. Modern archaeologists have developed a relative dating system, obsidian hydration dating, to calculate the age of obsidian artifacts.

=== Europe ===
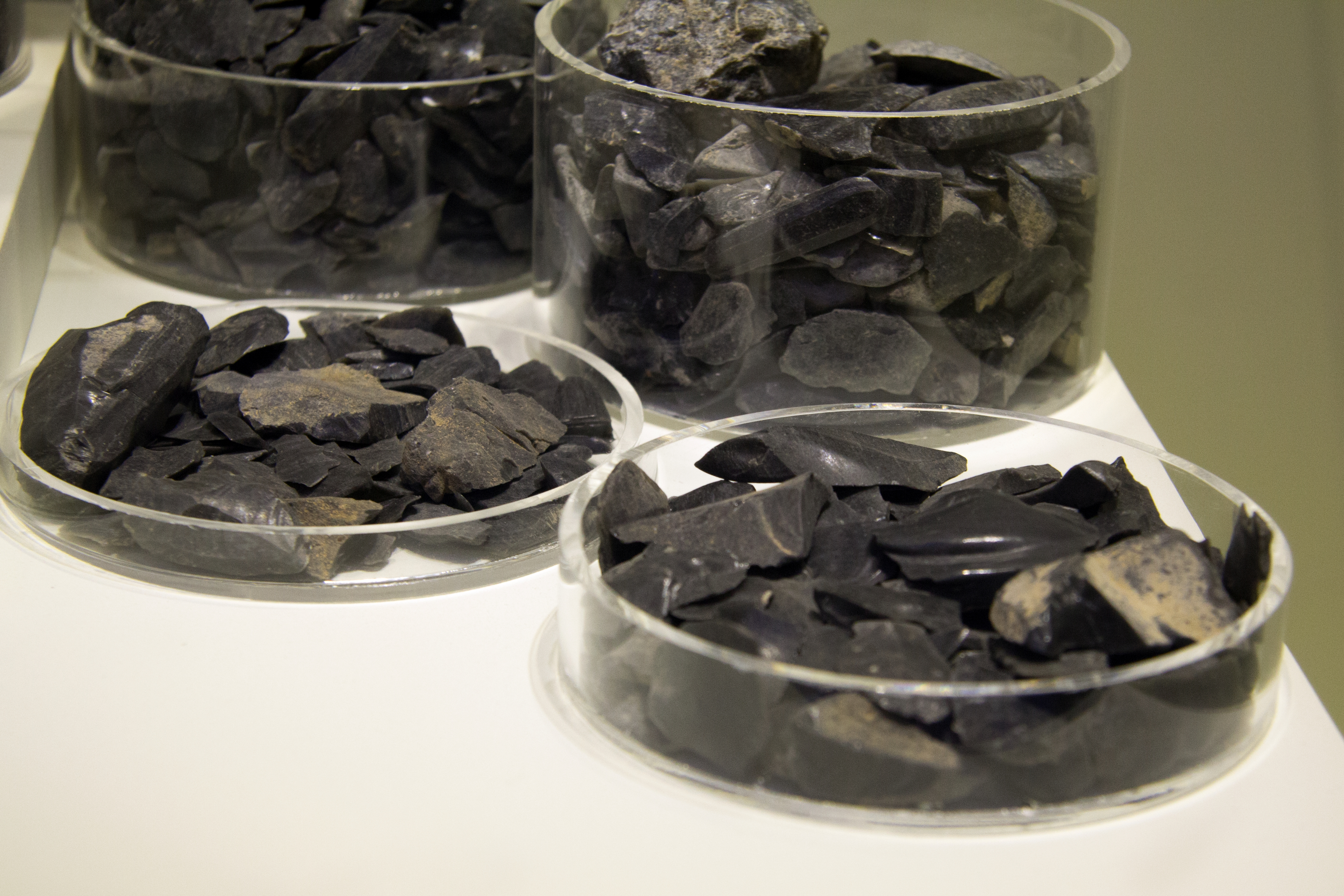
Obsidian imported from Milos, found in Minoan Crete

Obsidian artifacts first appeared in the European continent in Central Europe in the Middle Paleolithic and had become common by the Upper Paleolithic, although there are exceptions to this. Obsidian played an important role in the transmission of Neolithic knowledge and experiences. The material was mainly used for production of chipped tools which were very sharp due to its nature. Artifacts made of obsidian can be found in many Neolithic cultures across Europe. The source of obsidian for cultures inhabiting the territory of and around Greece was the island of Milos; the Starčevo–Körös–Criș culture obtained obsidian from sources in Hungary and Slovakia, while the Cardium-Impresso cultural complex acquired obsidian from the island outcrops of the central Mediterranean. Through trade, these artifacts ended up in lands thousands of kilometers away from the original source; this indicates that they were a highly valued commodity. X-ray fluorescence techniques have also allowed obsidian in Greece to be identified as coming from Milos, Nisyros or Gyali, islands in the Aegean Sea. John Dee had a mirror, made of obsidian, which was brought from Mexico to Europe between 1527 and 1530 after Hernando Cortés's conquest of the region.

=== Middle East and Asia ===
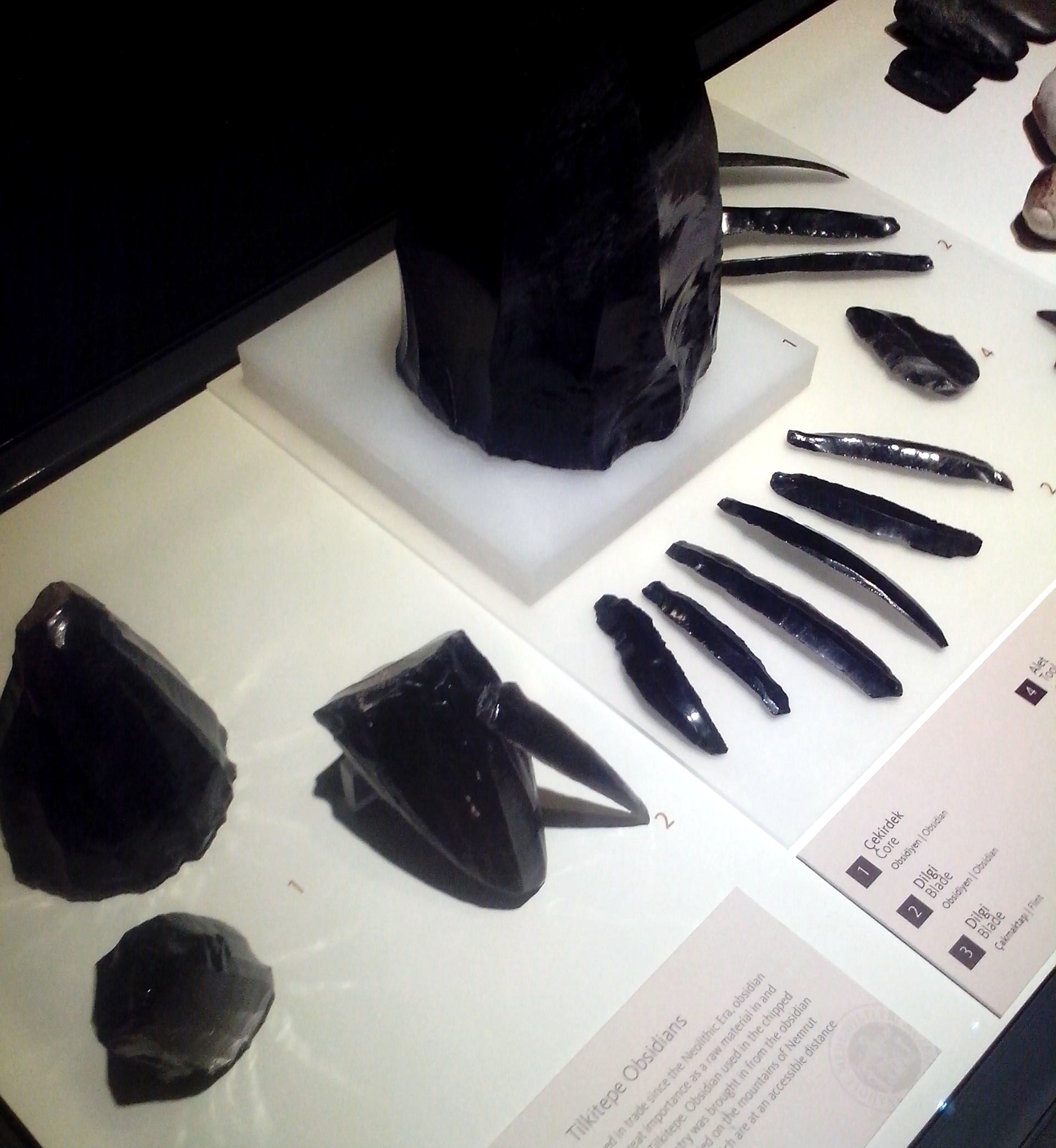
Obsidian tools from Tilkitepe, Turkey, 5th millennium BC. Museum of Anatolian Civilizations

In the Ubaid in the 5th millennium BC, blades were manufactured from obsidian extracted from outcrops located in modern-day Turkey. Ancient Egyptians used obsidian imported from the eastern Mediterranean and southern Red Sea regions. Obsidian scalpels older than 2100 BC have been found in a Bronze Age settlement in Turkey. In the eastern Mediterranean area the material was used to make tools, mirrors and decorative objects.

The use of obsidian tools was present in Japan near areas of volcanic activity. Obsidian was mined during the Jōmon period.

Obsidian has also been found in Gilat, a site in the western Negev in Israel. Eight obsidian artifacts dating to the Chalcolithic Age found at this site were traced to obsidian sources in Anatolia. Neutron activation analysis (NAA) on the obsidian found at this site helped to reveal trade routes and exchange networks previously unknown.

=== Americas ===
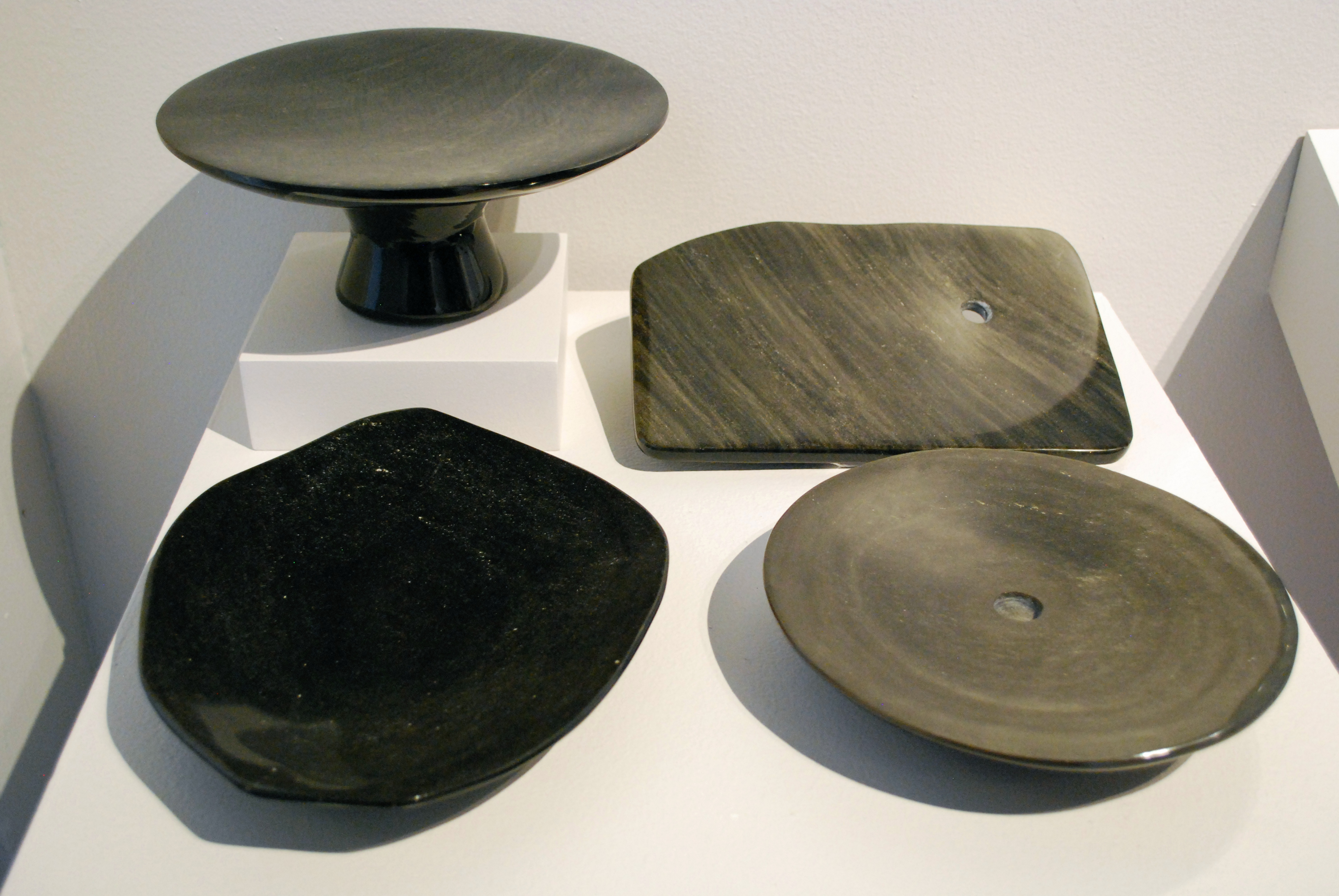
Obsidian worked into plates and other wares by Victor Lopez Pelcastre of Nopalillo, Epazoyucan, Hidalgo. On display at the Museo de Arte Popular, Mexico City

Indigenous people traded obsidian throughout the Americas. Each volcano and in some cases each volcanic eruption produces a distinguishable type of obsidian allowing archaeologists to use methods such as non-destructive energy dispersive X-ray fluorescence to select minor element compositions from both the artifact and geological sample to trace the origins of a particular artifact. Obsidian cores and blades were traded far inland from the coast. A particularly distant examples of traded obsidian are pieces from the Yellowstone Region found at Hopewell sites, such as Hopewell Culture National Historical Park, Ohio, over 1500 miles away.

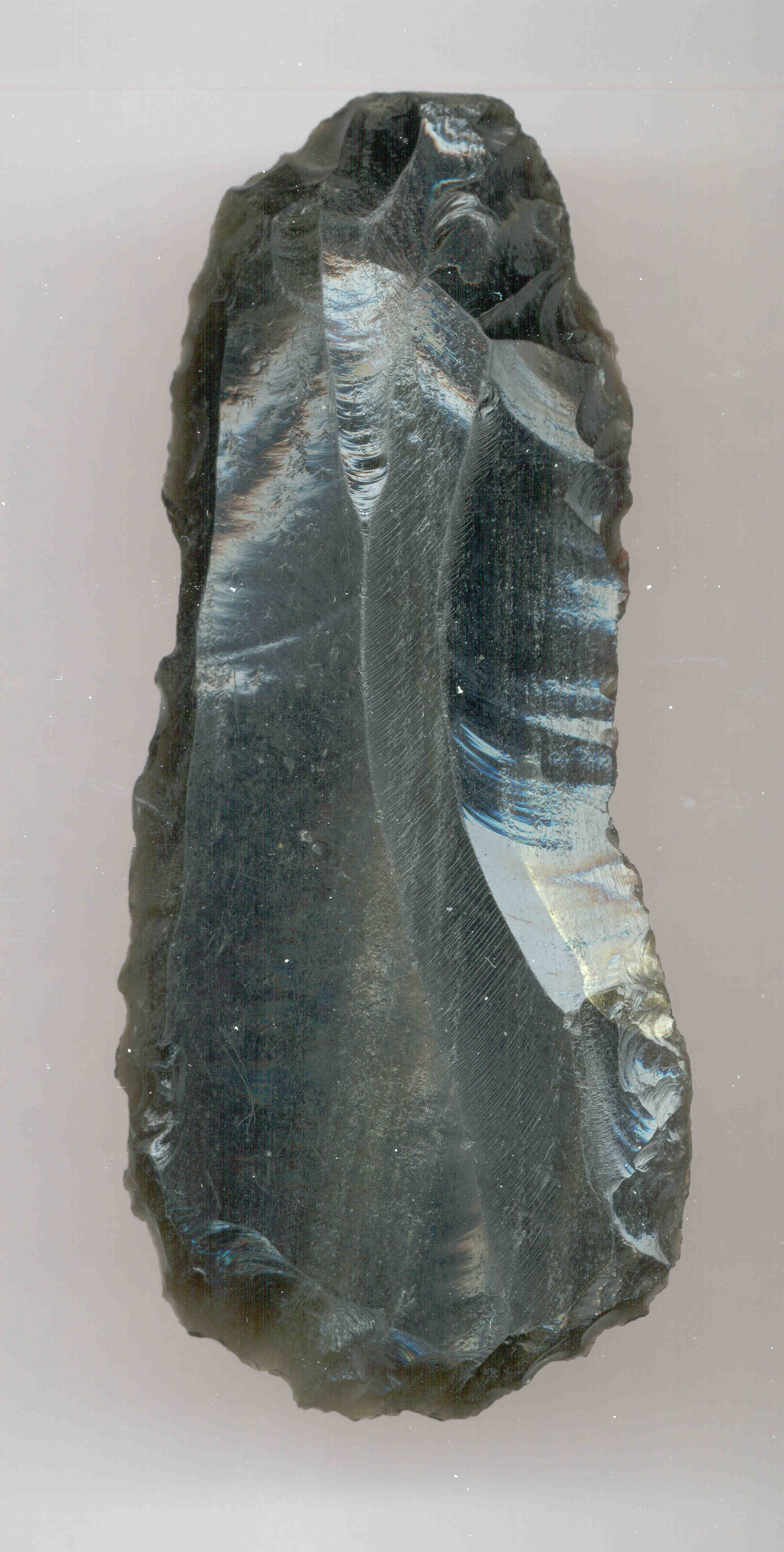
This obsidian scraper found at Spiro Mounds, Oklahoma, was sourced from Pachuca, Mexico; an example of vast Pre-Columbian trade networks.

Obsidian tools found in Mission Santa Clara have shown the existence of exchange networks between various tribes in California. Lithic analysis helps to understand pre-Hispanic groups in Mesoamerica. A careful analysis of obsidian in a culture or place can be of considerable use to reconstruct commerce, production, and distribution, and thereby understand economic, social and political aspects of a civilization. For example, the coastal Chumash sites in California indicate considerable trade with the distant site of Casa Diablo Hot Springs in the Sierra Nevada. Obsidian in California comes from five major locations all around the state, and when Mission Santa Clara was built, the tribes took their obsidian tools with them and from the analysis of the obsidian tools it showed that all five major location of obsidian were present. While in Mesoamerica, at the Maya city of Yaxchilán, even warfare implications have been studied linked with obsidian use and its debris. Green Pachuca obsidian was highly prized: it has been argued Teotihuacan monopolized the Pachuca deposit to control and influence Obsidian trade in Central Mexico during the Classic Period, and the Mexica of Tenochtitlan (the capital of the Aztec Empire), favored Pachuca obsidian for ritual deposits after rising to power. A scraper made from Pachuca obsidian has even been found at Spiro Mounds in Oklahoma.

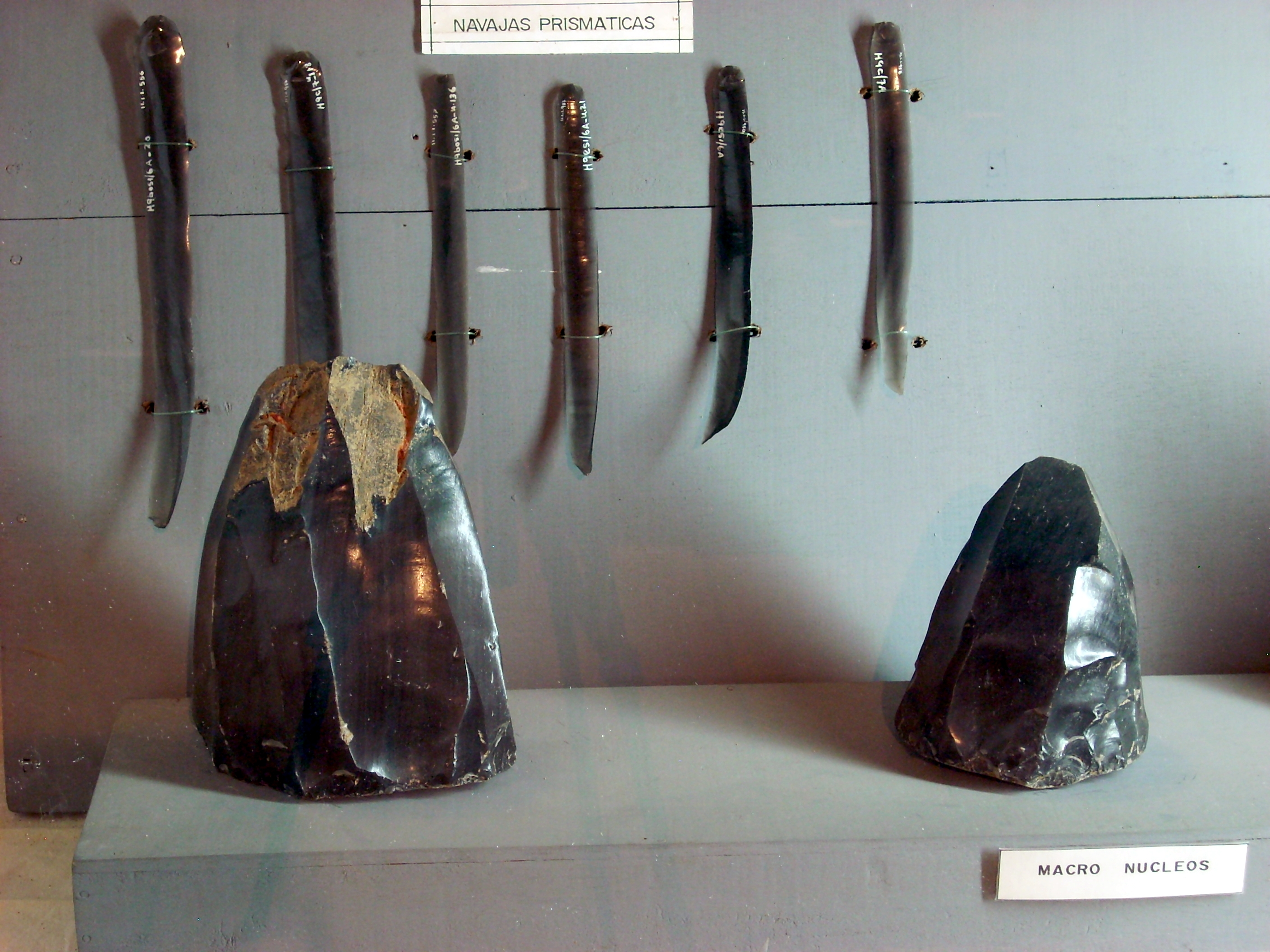
Raw obsidian and obsidian blades from the Mayan site of Takalik Abaj

Pre-Columbian Mesoamericans' use of obsidian was extensive and sophisticated; including carved and worked obsidian for tools and decorative objects. Mesoamericans made use of a variety of weapons using obsidian, such as macuahuitl, a type of sword with obsidian blades lining a wooden shaft, or the tepoztopilli, a polearm with a leaf or spade shaped wooden head lined with blades in a similar manner. Spanish sources describe these weapons as being able to kill and inflict terrible injuries.

Obsidian mirrors were used by some Aztec priests to conjure visions and make prophecies. They were connected with Tezcatlipoca, god of obsidian and sorcery, whose name can be translated from the Nahuatl language as 'Smoking Mirror'.

In Chile obsidian tools from Chaitén Volcano have been found as far away as in Chan-Chan 400 km (250 mi) north of the volcano, and also in sites 400 km south of it.

=== Oceania ===
The Lapita culture, active across a large area of the Pacific Ocean around 1000 BC, made widespread use of obsidian tools and engaged in long distance obsidian trading. The complexity of the production technique for these tools, and the care taken in their storage, may indicate that beyond their practical use they were associated with prestige or high status.

Obsidian was also used on Rapa Nui (Easter Island) for edged tools such as mataia and the pupils of the eyes of their Moai (statues), which were encircled by rings of bird bone. Obsidian was used to inscribe the Rongorongo glyphs.

== Current use ==
Obsidian can be used to make extremely sharp knives, and obsidian blades are a type of glass knife made using naturally occurring obsidian instead of manufactured glass. Obsidian is used by some surgeons for scalpel blades, although this is not approved by the US Food and Drug Administration (FDA) for use on humans. Well-crafted obsidian blades, like any glass knife, can have a cutting edge many times sharper than high-quality steel surgical scalpels: the cutting edge of the blade is only about three nanometers thick. All metal knives have a jagged, irregular blade when viewed under a strong enough microscope; however, obsidian blades are still smooth, even when examined under an electron microscope. One study found that obsidian incisions produced fewer inflammatory cells and less granulation tissue in a group of rats after seven days but the differences disappeared after twenty-one days. Don Crabtree has produced surgical obsidian blades and written articles on the subject. Obsidian scalpels may be purchased for surgical use on research animals.

The major disadvantage of obsidian blades is their brittleness compared to those made of metal, thus limiting the surgical applications for obsidian blades to a variety of specialized uses where this is not a concern.

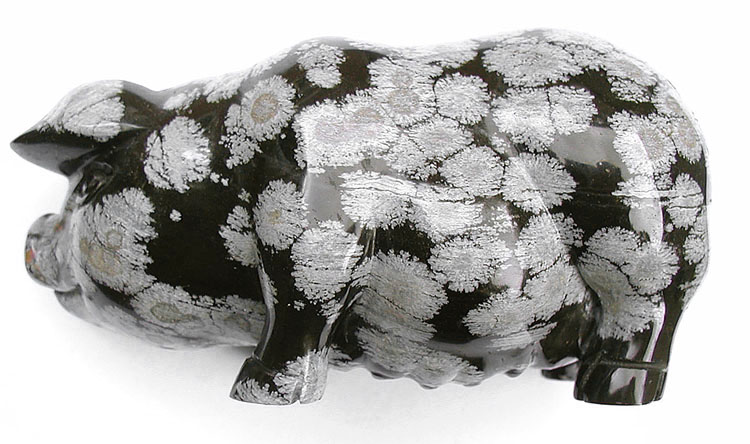
Pig carved in snowflake obsidian, 10 centimeters (4 in) long. The markings are spherulites.

Obsidian is also used for ornamental purposes and as a gemstone. It presents a different appearance depending on how it is cut: in one direction it is jet black, while in another it is glistening gray. "Apache tears" are small rounded obsidian nuggets often embedded within a grayish-white perlite matrix.

Plinths for audio turntables have been made of obsidian since the 1970s, such as the grayish-black SH-10B3 plinth by Technics.

== See also ==
- Helenite – Artificial glass made from volcanic ash
- Hyaloclastite – Volcanic rock consisting of glass fragments
- Tachylite – Form of basaltic volcanic glass
- Libyan desert glass – Desert glass found in Libya and Egypt
- Mayor Island / Tūhua – New Zealand shield volcano – a source of Māori obsidian tools
- Stone tool
- Vitrophyre – Glassy volcanic rock
- Yaxchilan Lintel 24 – Ancient Maya limestone relief from Mexico – Ancient carving showing a Maya bloodlet ritual involving a rope with obsidian shards.
