= Leek Aleer =

Australian rules footballer (born 2001)

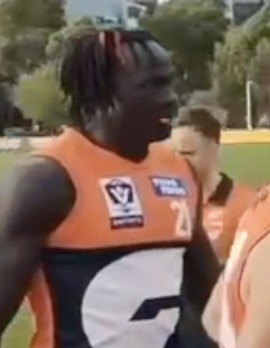
- Aleer in 2026

Personal information
- Born: 21 August 2001 (age 25); Nakodok, Kenya
- Original teams: Central District (SANFL); Angle Vale (APFL)
- Draft: No. 15, 2021 national draft
- Debut: Round 20, 2022, Greater Western Sydney vs. Sydney, at SCG
- Height: 194 cm (6 ft 4 in)
- Weight: 90 kg (198 lb)
- Position: Defender

Club information
- Current club: Greater Western Sydney
- Number: 21

Playing career^{1}
Years	Club	Games (Goals)
2022–	Greater Western Sydney	32 (2)
- ^{1} Playing statistics correct to the end of 2026.

Leek Aleer (/lɛk/ LEK; born 21 August 2001) is an Australian rules footballer who plays for the Greater Western Sydney Giants in the Australian Football League (AFL).

== Early life ==
Aleer was born in Kenya to South Sudanese parents as the eldest and only boy of six children and migrated to Adelaide, Australia as a refugee when he was five years old. After arriving, his uncles were fans of the Adelaide Crows and encouraged him to pursue Australian rules football.

Aleer played junior football for the Central Districts Football Club, eventually playing for their senior team in the SANFL, and the Angle Vale Football Club in the Adelaide Plains Football League.

Despite injury setbacks, Aleer broke the all-time record for the running vertical jump at the South Australian Draft Combine.

== AFL career ==
Aleer made his AFL debut for the Giants in round 20 of the 2022 AFL season, against the Swans.

During the 2024 AFL season, St Kilda expressed their interest in luring Aleer to Melbourne, Victoria in a trade. It wasn't until the 2025 trade period that Aleer made a trade request to the Saints. His trade value had increased throughout the 2025 season as the defender managed a career-best 13 appearances at AFL level. However, the highly-publicised move ultimately fell through as St Kilda withdrew from trade discussions, and he recommitted to the Giants for a further two years.

In 2026, Aleer found himself in a new role which provided him a regular spot in the senior team. He played as a ruck hybrid player, being able to swing forward and kick goals when needed. He kicked his first career goal in the Sydney Derby against the Swans.

== Statistics ==
Updated to the end of round 22, 2026.

Legend
G	Goals	K	Kicks	D	Disposals	T	Tackles
B	Behinds	H	Handballs	M	Marks

Season	Team	No.	Games	Totals							Averages (per game)							Votes
Season	Team	No.	Games	G	B	K	H	D	M	T	G	B	K	H	D	M	T	Votes
2022	Greater Western Sydney	21	4	0	0	25	13	38	19	9	0.0	0.0	6.3	3.3	9.5	4.8	2.3	0
2024	Greater Western Sydney	21	8	0	0	43	39	82	26	18	0.0	0.0	5.4	4.9	10.3	3.3	2.3	0
2025	Greater Western Sydney	21	13	0	0	59	64	123	48	18	0.0	0.0	4.5	4.9	9.5	3.7	1.4	0
2026	Greater Western Sydney	21	7	2	6	27	34	61	13	31	0.3	0.9	3.9	4.9	8.7	1.9	4.4	0
Career			32	2	6	154	150	304	106	76	0.1	0.2	4.8	4.7	9.5	3.3	2.4	0
