= Gyali =

Island in Greece

Native name: Γυαλί
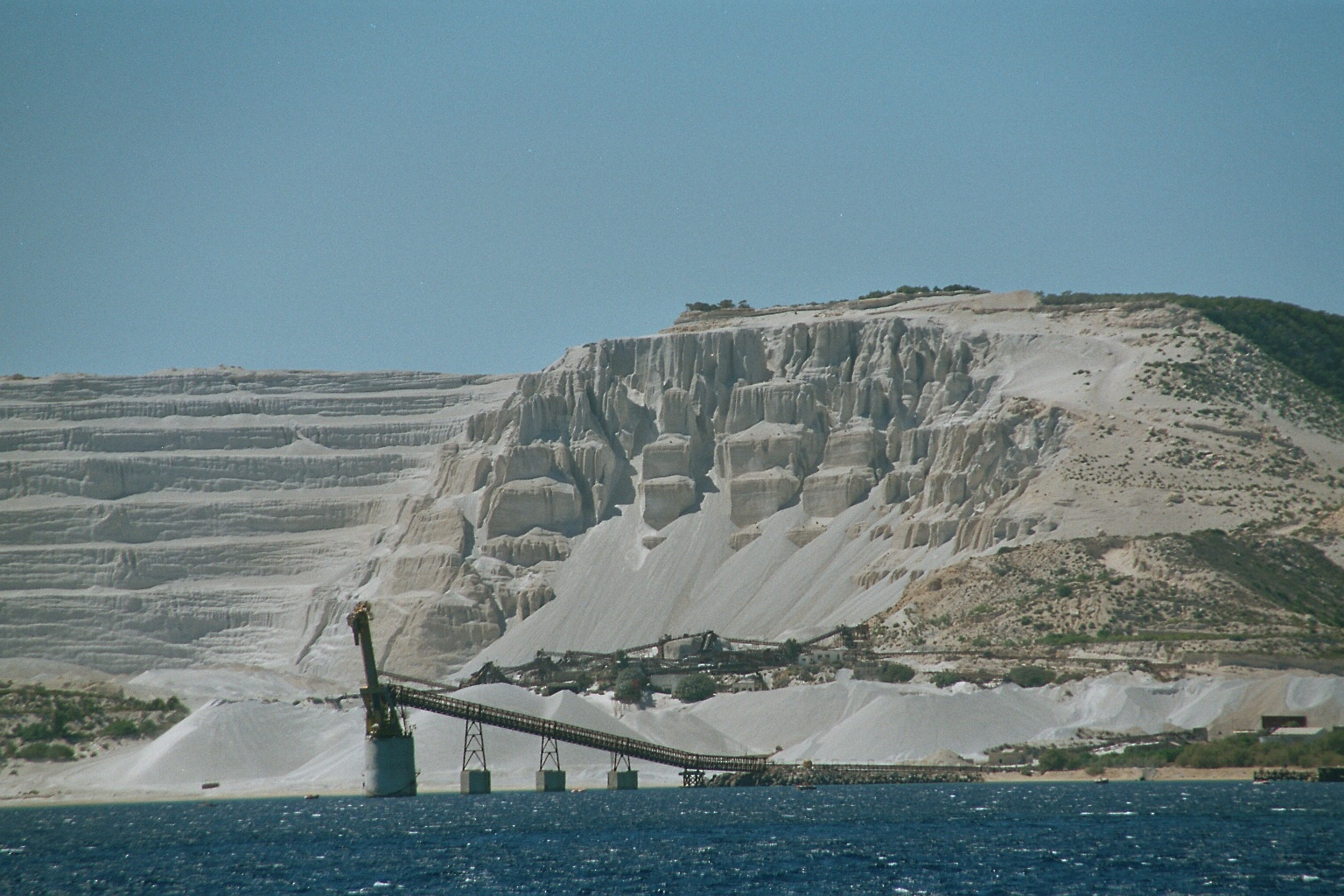
- Pumice mining on Gyali

- Location within Greece

Geography
- Coordinates: 36.662°N 27.115°E
- Archipelago: Dodecanese
- Area: 4.558 km^{2} (1.760 sq mi)
- Highest elevation: 180 m (590 ft)
- Highest point: Volcano

Administration
- Greece
- Region: South Aegean
- Regional unit: Kos
- Capital city: Chora

Demographics
- Population: 7 (2021)

Additional information
- Postal code: 853 03
- Area code: 22420
- Vehicle registration: ΚΧ, ΡΟ, ΡΚ

Gyali (Greek: Γυαλί "glass", also spelled Giali or Yali, pronounced [ʝaˈli]) is a Greek volcanic island in the Dodecanese, located halfway between the south coast of Kos (Kardamaina) and Nisyros. It consists of rhyolitic obsidian lava domes and pumice deposits (which are mined in huge quantities). No historical eruptions are known, but the most recent pumice eruptions overlie soils containing pottery and obsidian artifacts from the Neolithic period (10,000–4,500 BC). The island has two distinct segments, with the northeastern part almost entirely made of obsidian and the southwestern part of pumice. These are connected by a narrow isthmus and beach made of modern reef sediments. Anciently, the island was known as Istros (Ancient Greek: Ἴστρος).

== Geography ==
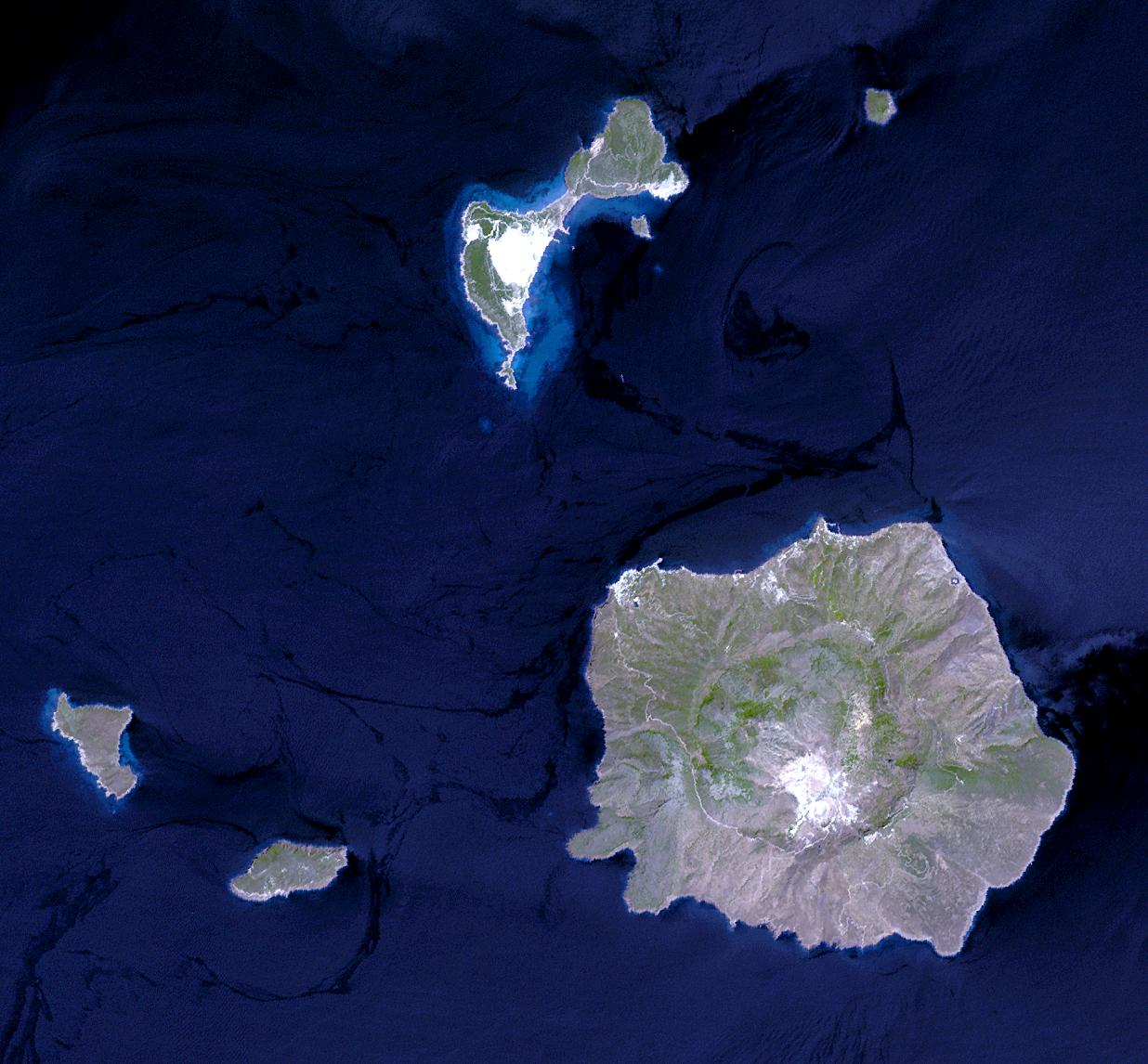
From right top counterclockwise: Stroggyli, Gyali, Pergoússa, Paheià and Nisyros.

The island is 6 km (4 mi) long and between 4 km (2 mi) and 500 m (1,640 ft) across. It has a 180 m (591 ft) cave. Parts of the island undergoing pumice strip mining are barren of vegetation. The 2001 census reported a resident population of 10 people. Administratively, it is part of the municipality of Nisyros.

== Settlement ==
Occupation at Gyali probably started in the early 4th millennium BC as a seasonal occupation. One settlement was at the site of 2 Laimos on the coast. Later in the 4th millennium BC, the occupation was at the north-west part of the island. The higher lands on the island were occupied mainly during the winter for cattle grazing.

Islanders were engaged in grain production, and some millstones were found. Large coarse ware pots were used for grain storage. They also practised animal husbandry and milk processing using cheese-pots. They processed obsidian and made pottery.

Early metalworking was practised on the island in the mid-4th millennium BC. Two crucibles with copper adhering have been found. This represents rare evidence for the earliest phase of Aegean metallurgy during the Final Neolithic period. Also one lead rivet has been found.

Gyali was abandoned by the end of the 4th millennium BC.

Gyali was resettled again after the 1821 revolution when Andreas Miaoulis used it as a hideaway. The population has varied recording 21 inhabitants in the 2011 census.

== See also ==
- List of volcanoes in Greece
