= Kariandusi prehistoric site =

Archaeological site in Kenya

Kariandusi Prehistoric Site
- Location within Kenya
- Location: Kariandusi, Kenya
- Nearest city: Nairobi, Kenya
- Coordinates: 00°42′00″S 36°30′00″E
- Governing body: National Museums of Kenya

Kariandusi prehistoric site (Eneo la kale ya Kariandusi in Swahili) is an archaeological site in Kenya. Located on the southeastern edge of the Great Rift Valley and on Lake Elmenteita, Kariandusi is an African Early Stone Age site dating to approximately 1 million years ago.

== History ==
This site was discovered by Louis Leakey in a 1928 expedition in the exposed Kariandusi riverbed. Leakey graduated St. John's College, Cambridge in 1926 with some of the best grades in his graduating class. Due to his success, St. John's awarded Leakey a research grant for his first East African Archaeological Expedition. Using funds for his Expedition, Leakey was able to finance three separate trips to the site (in 1928, 1931, and 1946) and several trip to his other research destinations including Olduvai Gorge and Lake Victoria. After Leakey, J.A.J. Gowlett and R.G. Crompton co-led a fourth expedition in 1974, and this was the last major excavation endeavor at the Kariandusi prehistoric site. However, there have been several research projects concerning the Kariandusi Prehistoric Site.

== Early Stone Age in Africa ==
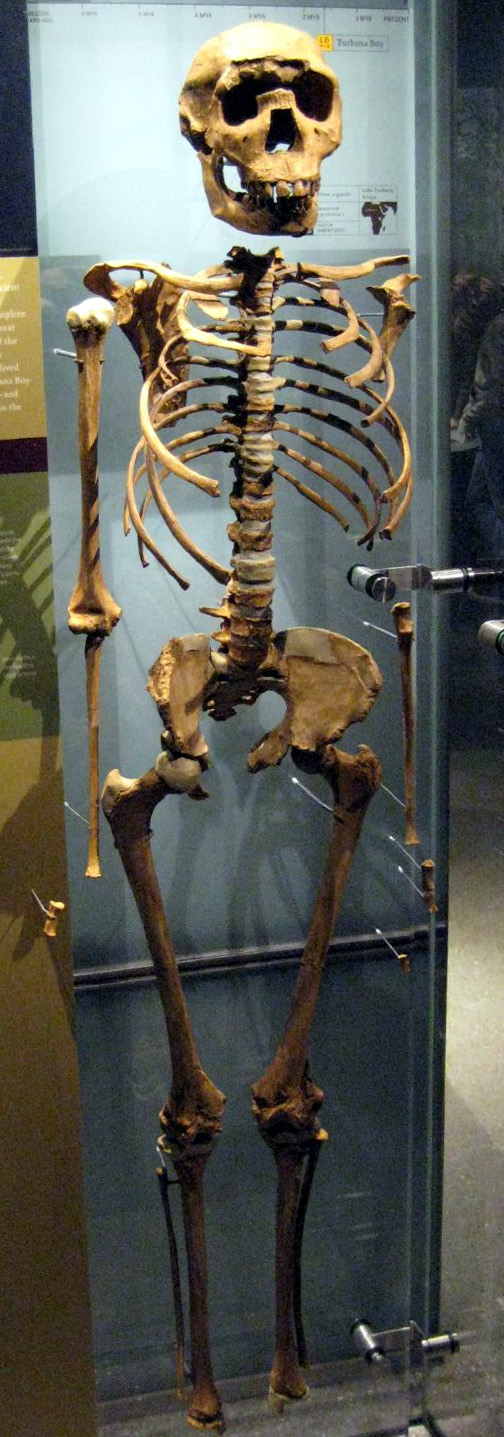
A Homo Erectus skeleton: the species that used and manufactured Mode 2 tools

The Early Stone Age (ESA) in Africa extends from about 2.6 million years ago to 280,000 years ago. It is also synonymous with the Lower Paleolithic. This was the period when the most well-known human ancestors were evolving: Australopithecus afarensis, Paranthropus boisei, Homo habilis (the "Handy Man"), and Homo erectus. At the time that Kariandusi was in use, 1 million years ago, Homo erectus was in the eastern African Rift Valley.

Besides the evolution of humans, there was the metaphorical evolution of tools. The ESA was the beginning of modern tool use, and the time period has two Modes (a way of classifying tools without designating them to certain cultural or ethnic groups). Mode 1 is primarily Oldowan "choppers," tools made from pebbles in the Olduvai Gorge area by, mostly, Homo habilis. Mode 2 includes the Acheulean handaxes found mostly in the Turkana Basin of Kenya, which were made primarily by Homo erectus. Kariandusi, due to its location in eastern Africa and the age of the site, was likely occupied by Homo erectus who produced Mode 2 technologies.

== Archaeological finds ==
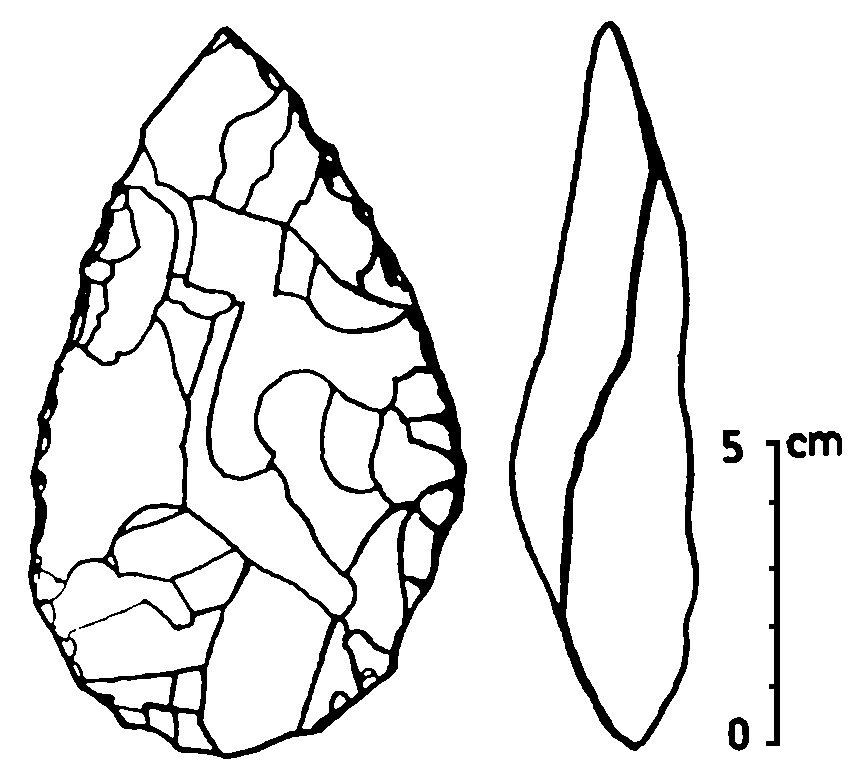
An Acheulean handaxe approximately 12 cm in height, similar to those found at Kariandusi

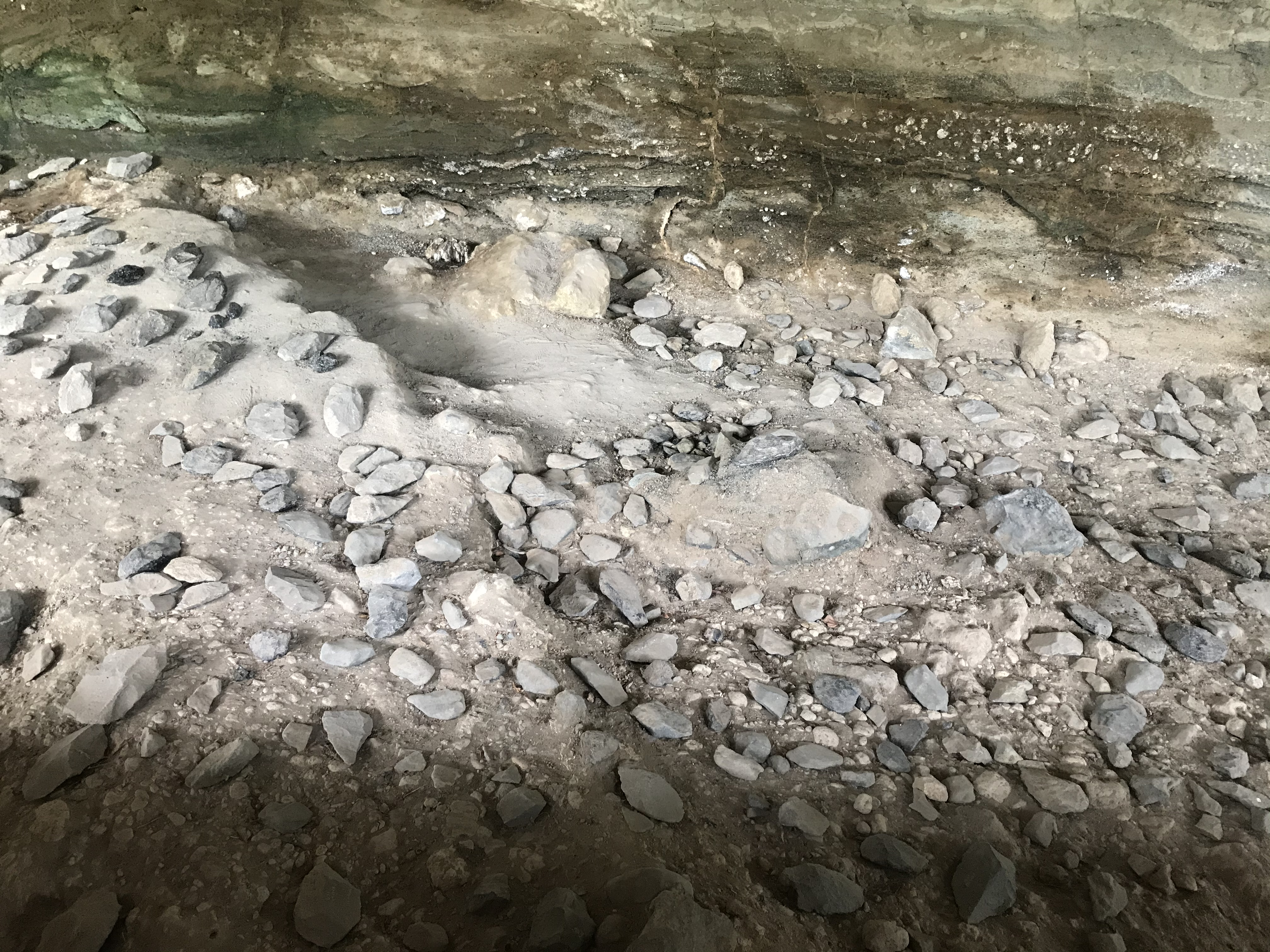
Acheulean hand-axes made of obsidian and trachyte from the Kariandusi Museum in Kenya

When this site was discovered and initially researched, the finds were sent to museums all around the world (as was common at the time). However, because the finds were not wholly cataloged, there is no comprehensive list of all finds from Kariandusi. To understand the scope of the assemblage, consider that Cambridge University alone has over 250 handaxes from Kariandusi. Obsidian was the main material used in making the Acheulean handaxes, but lava-based materials like quartz-trachyte were also used.

== Theories ==
Several theories address the nature of the Kariandusi site, including its possible use as a "factory" site, and why wear on the edges of the handaxes there are not typical of those from surrounding sites.

=== Factory ===
The sheer number of handaxes found at Kariandusi prompted notions that it had been a factory for Acheulean handaxes. It was also once thought of as one of the oldest in situ Acheulean hand axe site in the world. When it was discovered, the researchers believed it had been untouched since the last stoneworker had left. However, recent climate research has revealed that nearby Lake Elmenteita once reached further inland, and has receded in the past one million years, with the collection at Kariandusi having accumulated due to the water rushing over the land and depositing the hand axes there. The denial of this site as a factory is supported by the lack of waste found at the site i.e. no flakes or debris left over from the creation of the handaxes, which would be associated with dedicated factory.

=== Edge-wear ===
At Kariandusi it is common to find handaxes with little to no edge wear. This also helps contribute to the idea that Kariandusi was once a factory site: if it was a factory site, these axes would be created on site and then passed out or shipped to different communities around Kariandusi. A study by evolutionary biologist Steven Mithen puts out the theory that there was no edge wear because the handaxes weren't used as axes, but as "sexual lures," ways the nearby males would attract females. The minimal edge wear, coupled with the immense number of handaxes contributes to this idea. However, Mithen proposal has received little to no support.

== Handedness ==
Modern handedness is the topic of many psychological research articles, one suggesting that over 10% of the world's population is left handed. A 1997 archaeological research project, led by Laura Phillipson, analyzed about 250 Kariandusi handaxes for signs of handedness. Phillipson's team focused on 54 handaxes that appeared to have been used the least, with the least amount of wear on the edges, and analyzed the hand-hold spots on each specimen. Based on how comfortable a handaxe was to hold in either the left or right, 6 of the samples were proved to be left-handed. The full results of the research are as follows:

It was possible to assign a probable left handedness to 6 out of the 54 specimens examined, or 11%. Of the remainder, 45 were probably intended for right-handed use and 3, as mentioned above, were indeterminate.

— Laura Phillipson, Cambridge University

Because 11% of the selected handaxes appeared to be left-handed axes, the conclusion is that modern human handedness was already appearing in the Early to Middle Stone Age, almost 1 million years ago.

== Kariandusi Museum ==
The National Museums of Kenya is a state corporation that monitors national Kenyan museums and monuments, including Kariandusi. A museum was built at Kariandusi near the prehistoric site, with a stairway going down to where the handaxes were discovered. The Kariandusi Museum also addresses several other nearby historic sites as well. The NMK - Kariandusi website advertises the following:

- Nature Trail
- Archaeological Site
- Museum
- Picnic Site
- Diatomite Mining Site
- Caves
- Monumental Church Building
