= Lela, Kenya =

Place in Kenya

Coordinates: 00°02′00″S 34°36′00″E

Lela is a small town in western Kenya near Lake Victoria. Elevation 1454m.

== Transport ==
It is located 20 km northwest of Kisumu and 5 km south of Maseno, off the B1 road between Kisumu and Busia.

It is served by a little used lightly built branchline of the Kenya railway system, which is slated for upgrade.

== See also ==
- Railway stations in Kenya
