= Ziwani =

Minor town served by railway system connecting Kenya to Tanzania

Coordinates: 03°22′56″S 37°47′29″E

Ziwani is a small town in Coast Province of Kenya near the border with Tanzania.

== Transport ==
It is served by a station on the national railway system of Kenya, on the international line from Mombasa via Voi to Moshi, Tanzania.

== See also ==
- Railway stations in Kenya
