= Kedowa =

- Country: Kenya
- County: Kericho County
- Elevation: 2,306 m (7,566 ft)
- Time zone: UTC+3 (EAT)

Kedowa is a settlement in Kenya's Kericho County.

== See also ==
- Railway stations in Kenya
