= List of volcanoes in Greece =

This is a list of active and extinct volcanoes in Greece.

Name	Elevation (m)	(ft)	Location	Last eruption
Aegina	?	?	37°45′N 23°26′E	Pleistocene
Gyali	180	591	36.671°N 27.140°E	Holocene
Kos	430	1411	36.852°N 27.251°E	Pleistocene
Methana	760	2493	37.615°N 23.336°E	258 BC
Milos	751	2464	36.699°N 24.439°E	140 AD
Nisyros	698	2290	36.586°N 27.160°E	1888
Poros	80	240	37.499°N 23.457°E	Pliocene
Santorini (Kolumbo)	-18	-60	36.517°N 25.492°E	1650 BC
Thera	130	390	36.404°N 25.396°E	1950
Sousaki	?	?	37.936°N 23.087°E	Quaternary
