= Mandraki =

Mandraki Μανδράκι
- Community
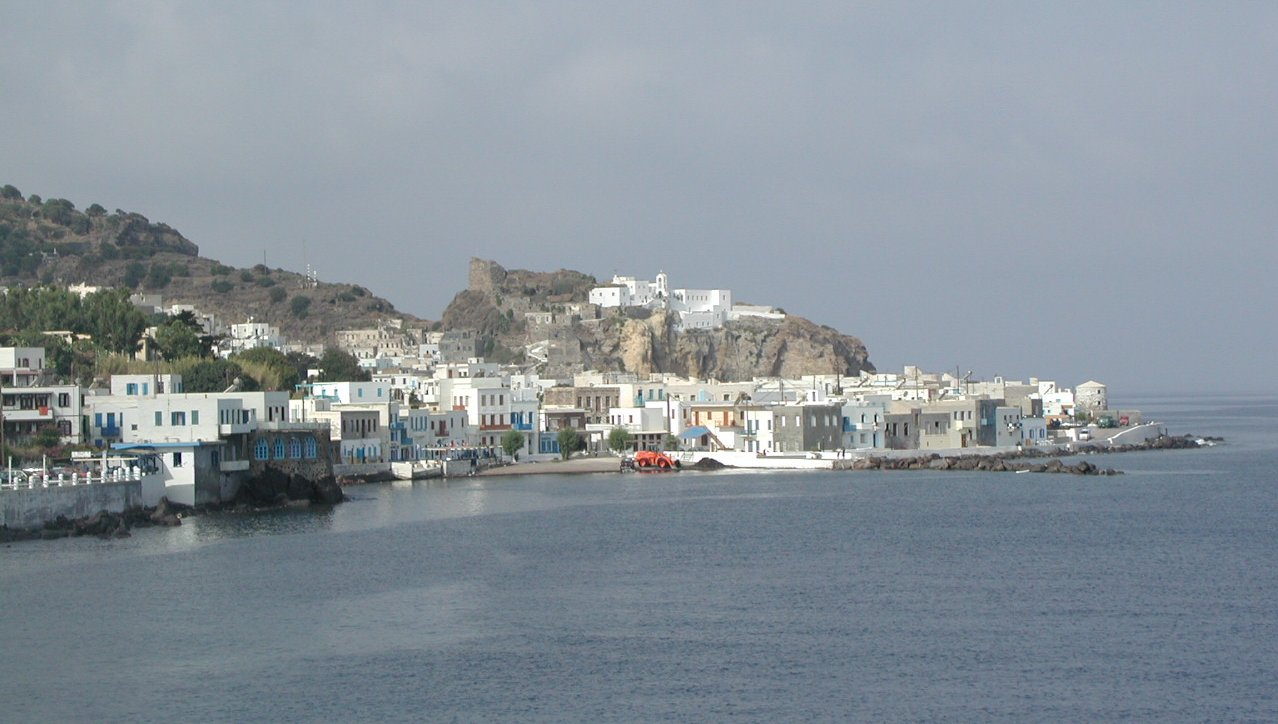

- Location within Greece
- Coordinates: 36°36′41″N 27°8′0″E
- Country: Greece
- Administrative region: South Aegean
- Regional unit: Kos
- Municipality: Nisyros

Population (2021)
  - Community: 791
- Time zone: UTC+2 (EET)
  - Summer (DST): UTC+3 (EEST)

Mandraki is the capital of the island municipality of Nisyros in Greece. It is the largest settlement on the island. It is also the harbour of the island and contains many of the island's facilities of tourism such as hotels and apartments. The population is 791 (2021).

== Attractions ==
There are many beaches as well as many places to eat and drink. The castle, built in 1315, overlooks the settlement.

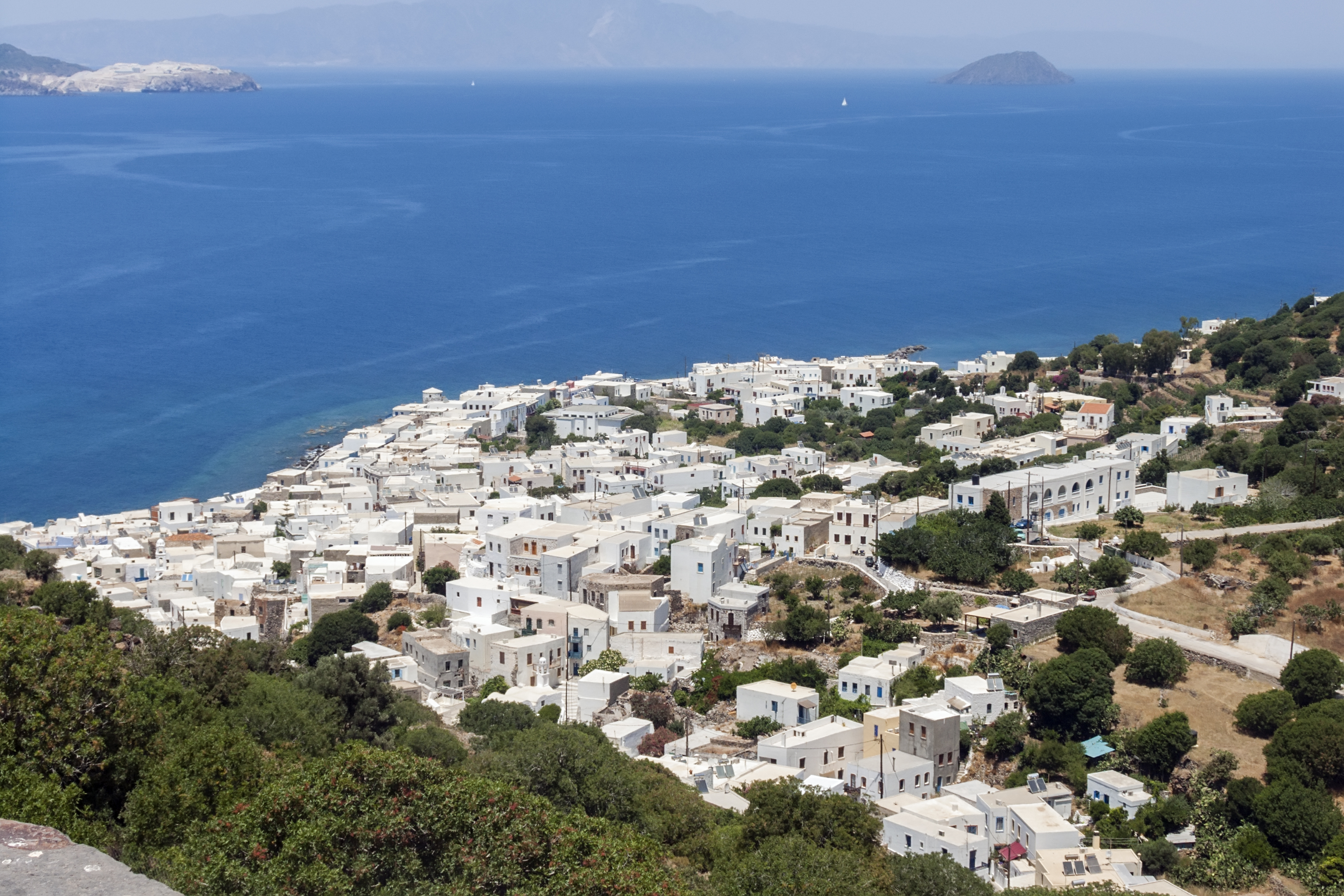
View of Mandraki

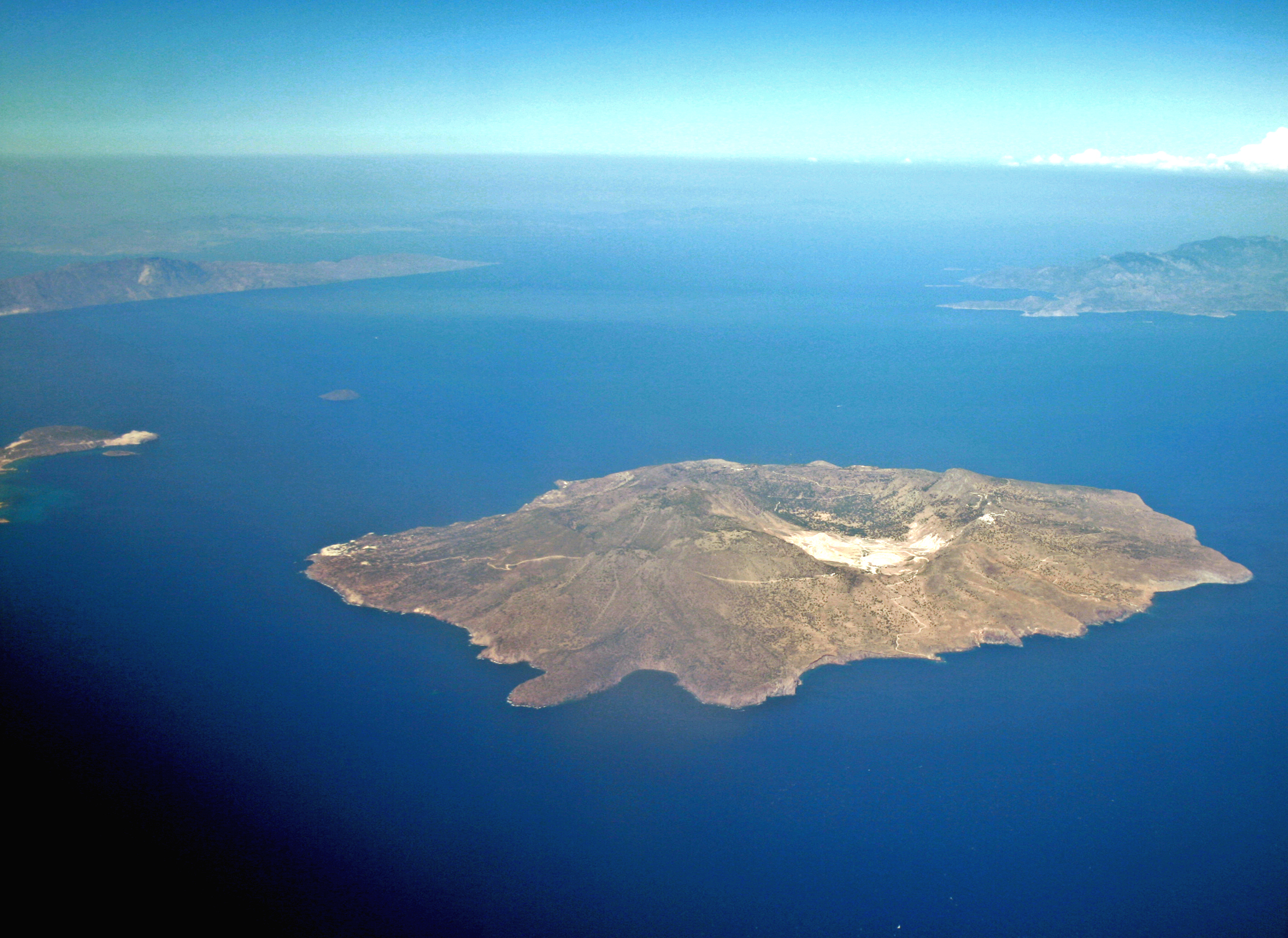
Nisyros with Mandraki on the left
