= Mianga =

- Location within Kenya
- Coordinates: 0.56°N 34.4°E
- Country: Kenya
- County: Bungoma County
- Time zone: UTC+3 (EAT)

Mianga is a settlement in Kenya's Bungoma County.
