= Nisyros =

Greek island in the Aegean Sea

Nisyros Νίσυρος
- Municipality
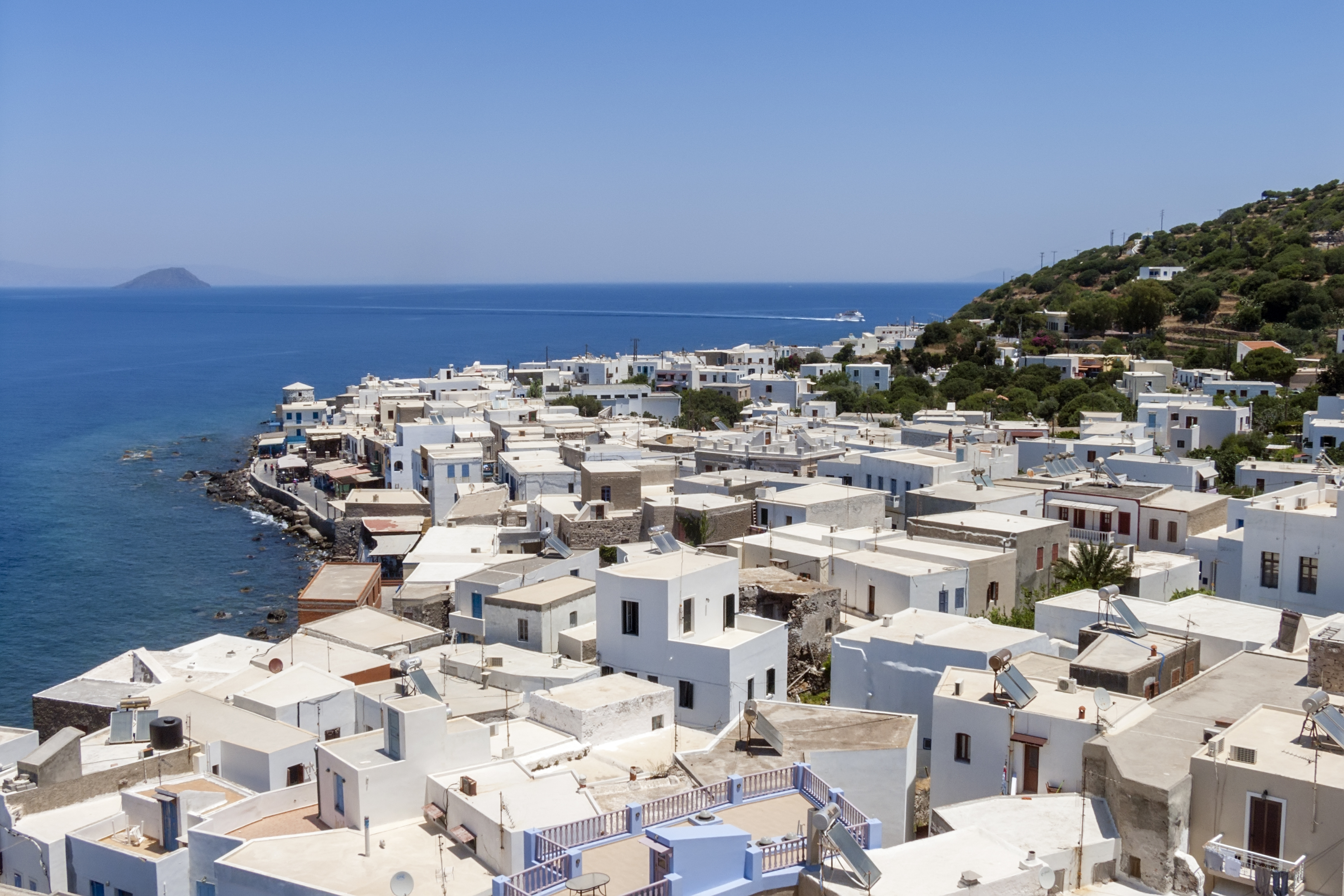
- View of Mandraki

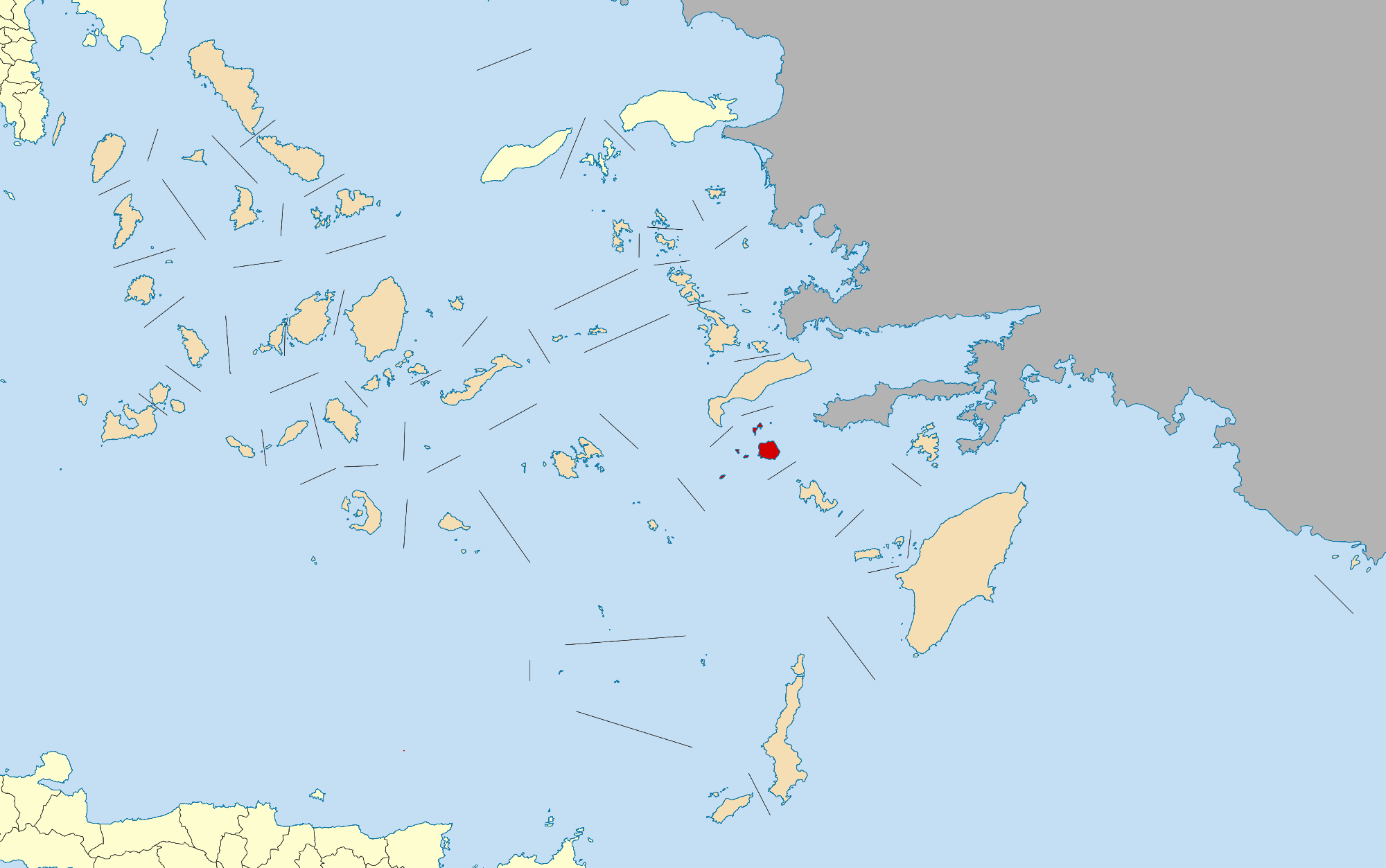

- Location within Greece
- Coordinates: 36°35′N 27°10′E
- Country: Greece
- Administrative region: South Aegean
- Regional unit: Kos
- Seat: Mandraki

Area
  - Municipality: 50.06 km^{2} (19.33 sq mi)
- Highest elevation: 698 m (2,290 ft)
- Lowest elevation: 0 m (0 ft)

Population (2021)
  - Municipality: 1,048
  - Density: 20.93/km^{2} (54.22/sq mi)
- Time zone: UTC+2 (EET)
  - Summer (DST): UTC+3 (EEST)
- Postal code: 853 03
- Area code: 22420
- Vehicle registration: ΚΧ, ΡΟ, ΡΚ
- Website: www.nisyros.gr

Nisyros, also spelled Nisiros (Greek: Νίσυρος, romanized: Nísyros; Modern Greek pronunciation: [ˈnisiros]), is a volcanic Greek island and municipality located in the Aegean Sea. It is part of the Dodecanese group of islands, situated between the islands of Kos and Tilos.

Its shape is approximately round, with a diameter of about 8 km (5 mi), and an area of 41.6 km^{2} (16.062 sq mi). Several other islets are in the direct vicinity of Nisyros, the largest of which is Gyali, with a population of 22 citizens. The Municipality of Nisyros includes Gyalí, as well as uninhabited Pacheiá, Pergoússa, Kandelioussa, Ágios Antónios, and Strongýli. It has a total land area of 50.055 km^{2} (19.326 sq mi) and a total population of 1,048 inhabitants (2021).

== Geology ==
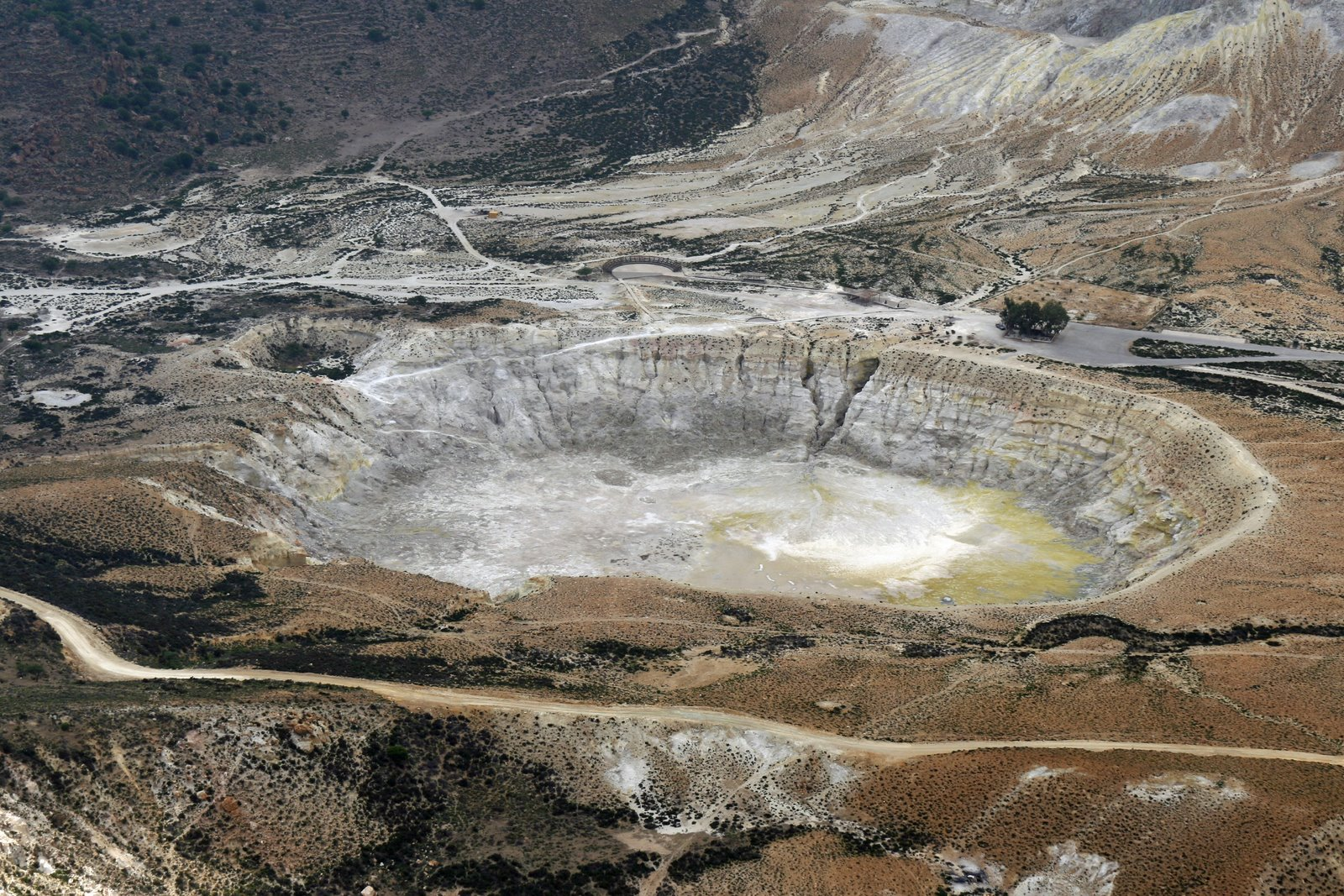
Stefanos, the largest crater of the volcano.

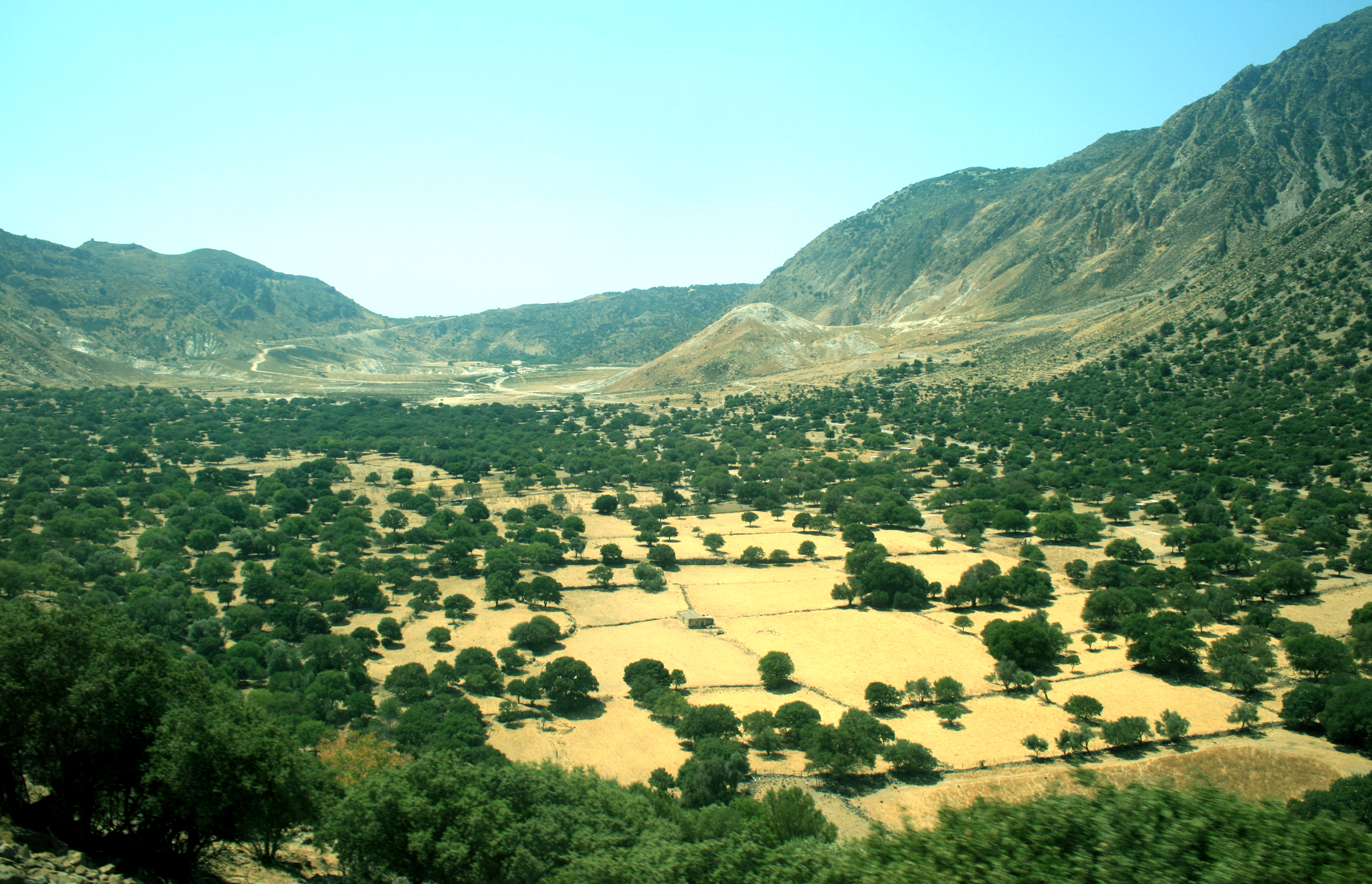
Landscape

The island has a 3–4-kilometre-wide (1.9–2.5 mi) caldera, which was formed within the past 150,000 years, with three separate eruptive stages, ranging from explosive and effusive andesitic eruptions to explosive and effusive dacitic and rhyolitic activity. Its coasts are generally rocky or pebbled, but there are also a few sandy beaches (mainly in the northeastern part). The volcano is currently active but not erupting, and fumaroles are found at the craters. It has had four historical eruptions, all of which had a VEI of 2. Almost all of its eruptions involved phreatic activity. The latest eruptive activity was a steam explosion in 1888, after small ash eruptions in 1871 and 1873, and earthquakes are frequent. A period of seismic unrest in 1996–1997 led an international team of scientists to initiate monitoring of the volcanic unrest, as part of the EU-sponsored Geowarn project. The entire volcanic complex includes the seafloor between Nisyros and Kos, the island of Gyali, and a part of Kos island.

== Geography ==
Nisyros can experience etesian winds between June and August. This is most obvious on the eastern and western flanks of the volcano, where trees are bent towards the south from the force of the winds. The wind may be especially strong on the island due to jet effects as it passes over Kos.

=== Settlements ===
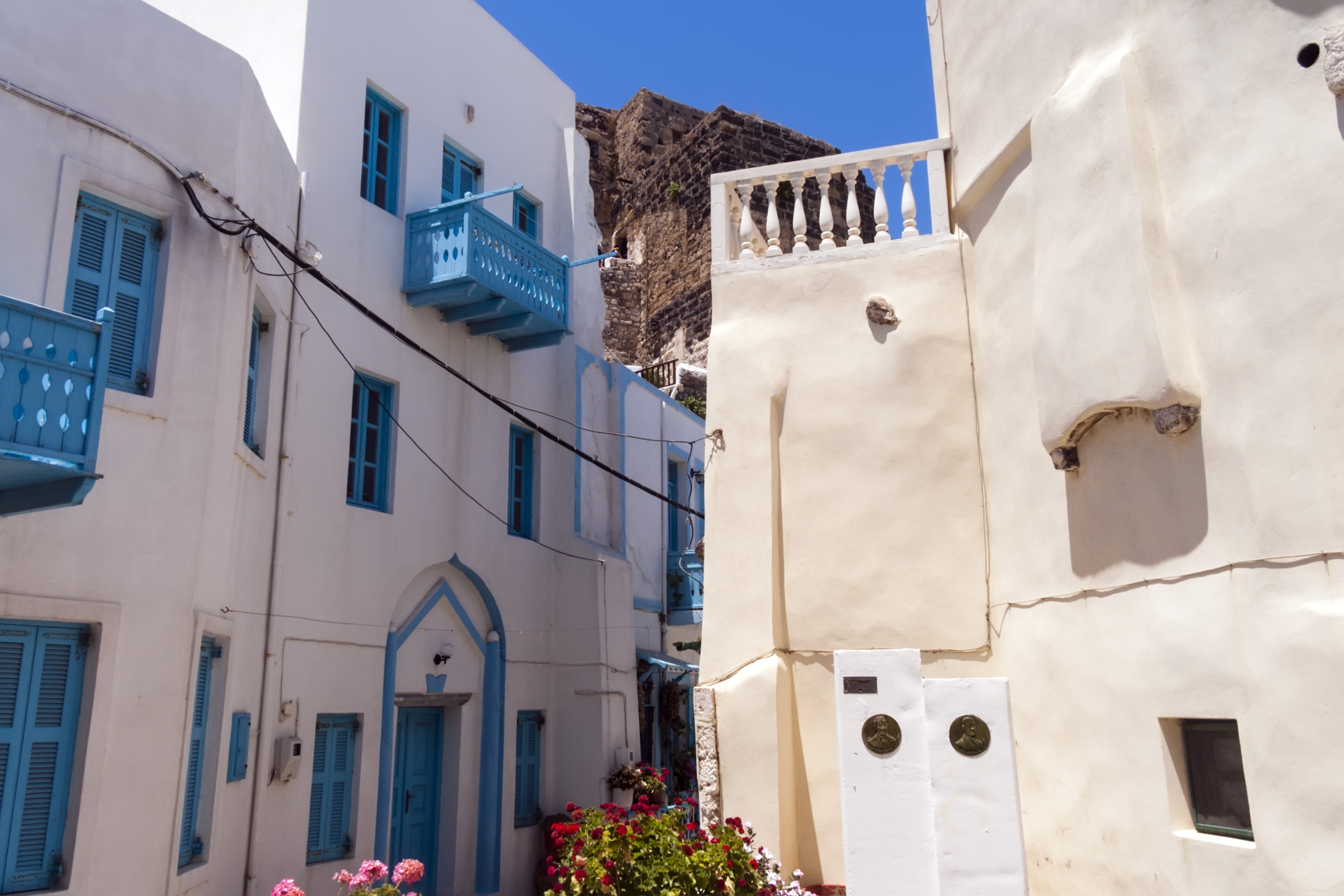
Street of Mandraki

The island is reachable by ship from Piraeus, Rhodes, and Kos, and in summer, there are many daily trips from the village of Kardamena on Kos. There is also a heliport. The main town and port of the island is Mandraki (pop. 660). Other villages are Paloi (239), Nikia (61), and Emporeios (27). According to the 2011 census, the municipality's resident population is 1,008 (including 21 on Gyali), although in summer it is augmented by many tourists as well as expatriate Nisyrians who visit the island for their vacations. Tourism is not so heavily developed as on other Greek islands. Deposits of perlite and pumice on Gyali provide much of the wealth of the island. The island used to be self-sufficient, and many crops were grown on its terraced slopes. Today, though, they are cultivated on a smaller scale.

Nisyros
- Νίσυρος
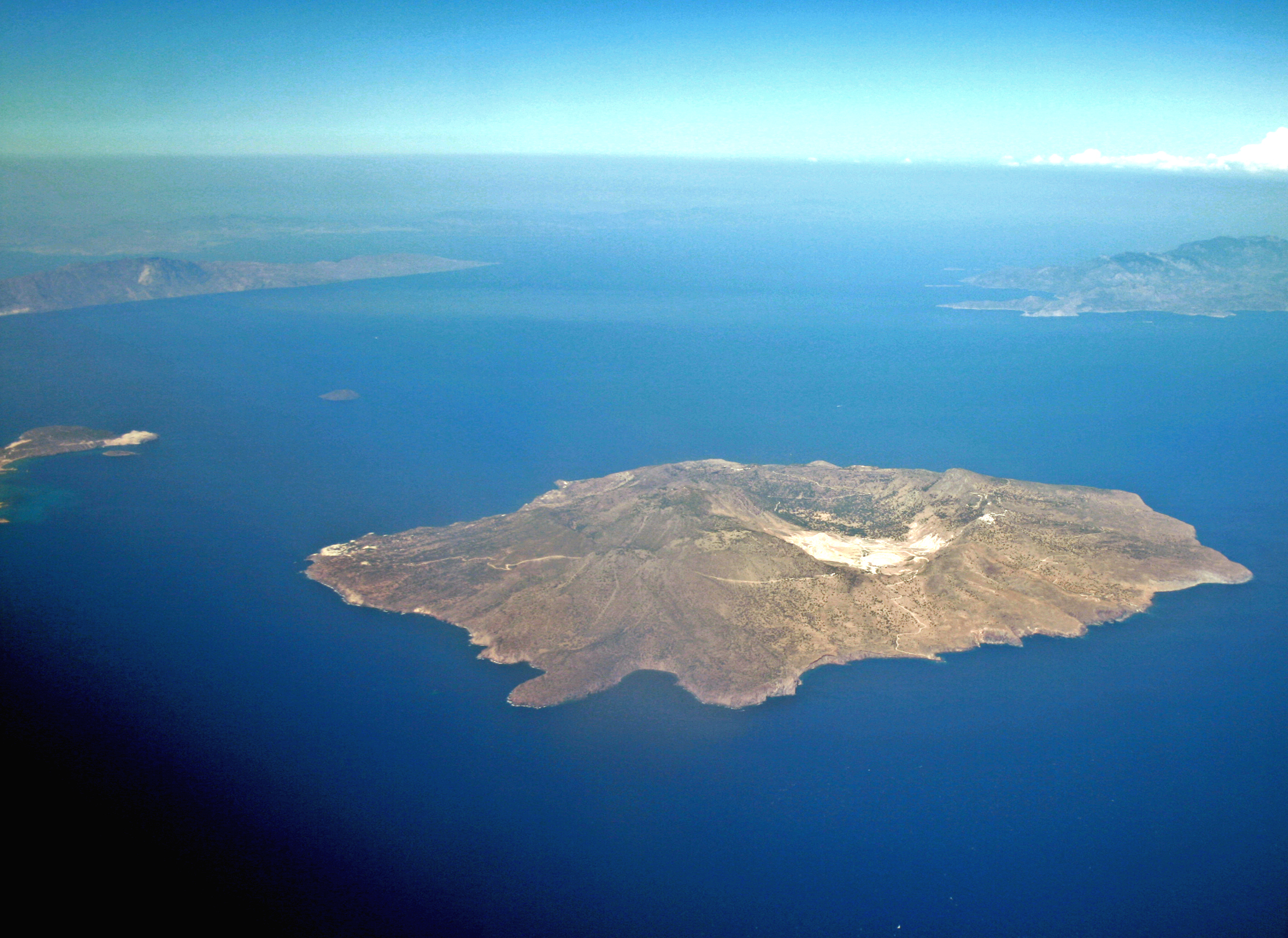
- Aerial view of Nisyros. Nisyros is the large island in the foreground.

Highest point
- Elevation: 698 m (2,290 ft)
- Coordinates: 36.586°N 27.160°E

Geography
- Location: Aegean Sea, Greece

Geology
- Mountain type: Stratovolcano with a Caldera
- Last eruption: September 1888

=== Climate ===
According to the station of the National Observatory of Athens, Nisyros has a hot semi-arid climate (Köppen climate classification: BSh) with mild winters and hot summers. Nisyros has an average annual temperature of around 20.0°C and an average annual precipitation of around 350 mm (May 2017 – Mar 2023).

== Geothermal energy ==
Nisyros has one of the most important, high-enthalpy geothermal fields in Greece, with a fluid temperature of over 350 °C and a high pressure of 18 bar; based on feasibility studies, the geothermal potential of the island is at least 50 MW.

Over time, efforts have been made by the operator, PPC Renewables, to exploit geothermal energy in the area for energy production.

The most recent plan was to gradually create and operate a geothermal plant with a capacity of 20 to 25 MW in cooperation with international specialized institutions. Given the estimated energy needs of Nisyros (1–2 MW), it was considered possible to supply electricity to the neighbouring islands of Kos, Tilos, Kalymnos, and Leros. However, long-lasting protests by the local community of Nisyros have blocked any plans to exploit the geothermal field for years. Indeed, in 1997 the Municipality of Nisyros held a referendum on the issue, with the result being 87% against the plans of the PPC.

Entities of Nisyros, such as the Nisyros Studies Company, some municipal authorities, and many scientists of the sector, have expressed their objections to the plans of PPC Renewables, raising safety issues due to the particular danger of the volcano of Nisyros, the seismic activity that often follows similar drilling, and the management of toxic waste. A point of friction was that the local community felt that it had been ignored in the decision-making process and in the planning of the project.

== History ==
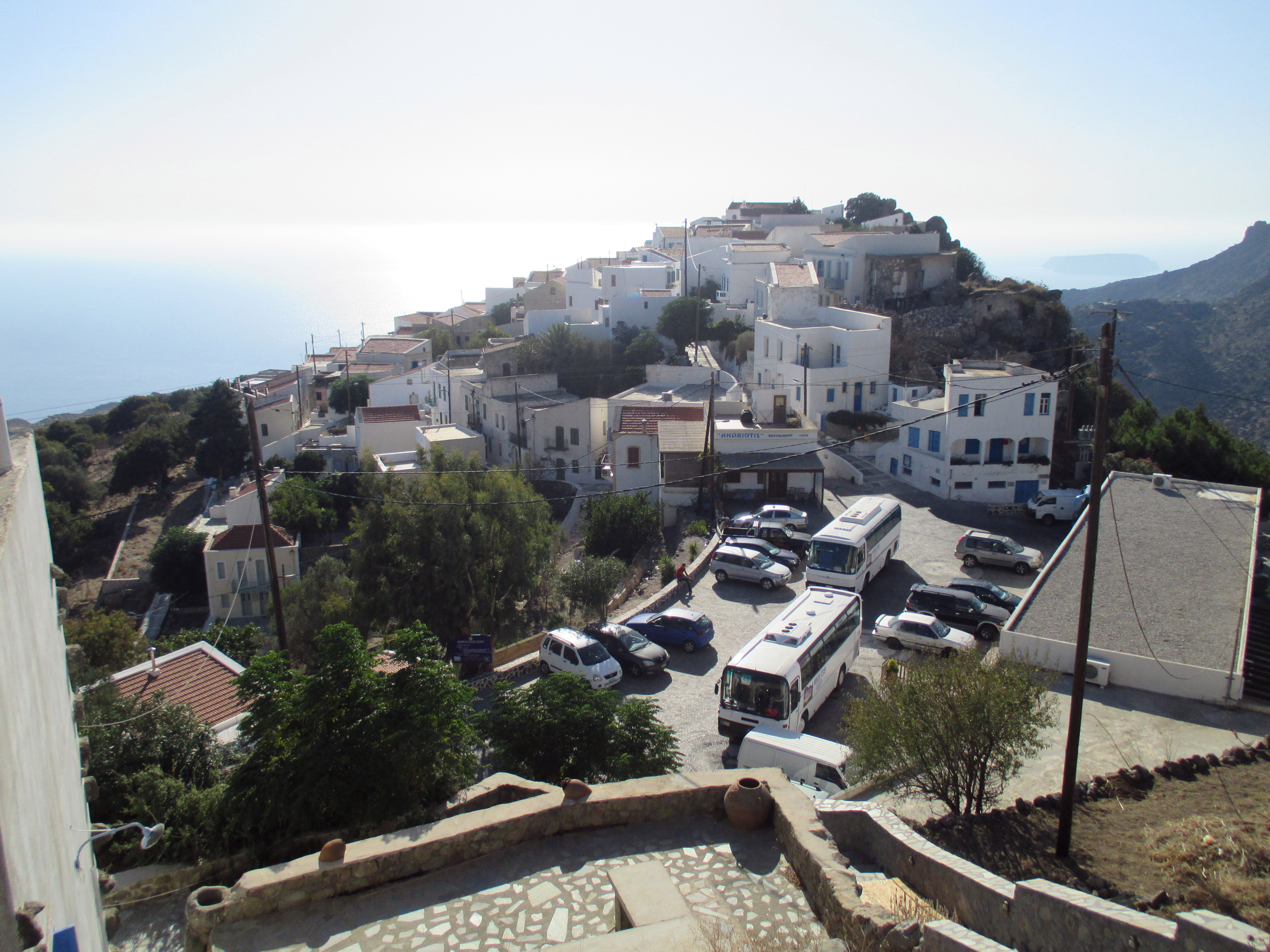
Nikia village

According to Greek mythology, the island was formed when Poseidon cut off a part of Kos and threw it onto the giant Polybotes to stop him from escaping. The ancient name of the Nisyros was Porphyris.

=== Iron Age ===
The island is mentioned by Homer in the Iliad.

=== Classical Age ===
==== Satrapy of Caria ====
Ancient walls, dating from the 5th century BC, part of the acropolis of the island, are found near Mandraki.

It was apparently also a source of millstones used in some of the earliest watermills, being referred to by epigrammatist Antipater of Thessalonica in the 1st century BC.

==== Roman period ====
In Roman times it became part of the Insulae province.

=== Medieval Age ===
In the 10th and 11th centuries, Genoese captains and adventurers who had a private fleet organized in clans united by family ties, exercised sovereignty and maritime control on behalf of the Byzantines, and these clans in exchange for the protection of the seas were given a concession to exploit raw materials, rights of trade, and collection of customs duties.

The Knights Hospitaller in 1315 were allowed to settle on the island upon payment of rent to the Genoese government ruled by the Vignolo family, and they built the crusader castle.

In the following centuries there were clashes between Turks and Venetian crusaders, and with uncertain outcomes, the island passed to the Ottomans in 1566, then passed almost four centuries later from the Ottomans to the Italians in 1911 during the Italo-Turkish War, along with the rest of the Dodecanese islands. It finally was annexed to the Greek Kingdom after the Second World War, in 1947.

== Christianity ==
The patron saint of the island is New Martyr Niketas of Nisyros. Many Orthodox Christian churches are found on the island, as well as four monasteries which are not inhabited by monks today, although various celebrations take place in them. The largest monastery is the one of Panagia Spiliani (Blessed Virgin Mary of the cave) at Mandraki; it is built beside the medieval castle erected by the Knights Hospitaller.

=== Diocese of Nisyrus ===
Nisyrus was a suffragan of Rhodes, but the bishopric faded. Known bishops included Matthaeus de Cheselles (appointed 1436), Pierre Fridaricus (served from the 1480s), Pedro Xague (appointed 1560), and Jerónimo Clavijo (appointed 1564).

=== Latin titular see ===
The diocese was nominally restored in 1927 as titular see of the lowest (episcopal) rank, initially named Nysirus (Curiate Italian Nisiro), and renamed Nisyrus in 1928. It has been vacant for decades, having had the following incumbents:

- Francesco Fellinger (26 February 1929 – 22 July 1940)
- Augusto Osvaldo Salinas Fuenzalida, Picpus Fathers (SS.CC.) (9 February 1941 – 3 August 1950)
- Elizeu Simões Mendes (21 August 1950 – 19 September 1953)
- Carlos Maria Jurgens Byrne, Redemptorists (C.SS.R.) (7 February 1954 – 17 December 1956) (later Archbishop)
- Augusto Trujillo Arango (25 April 1957 – 31 March 1960) (later Archbishop)
- Auguste Joseph Gaudel (1 September 1960 – 8 August 1969)

== Culture ==
A traditional product of Nisyros is soumada, a non-alcoholic almond-flavoured drink.

== Twinning ==
Mandraki is twinned with the following municipalities:

- Lapithos, Cyprus

== Notable natives and residents ==
- John Catsimatidis, New York City owner of Gristedes

== See also ==
- List of volcanoes in Greece
- List of traditional Greek place names
