= Kariandusi =

Settlement in Nakuru County, Kenya

Kariandus
- Location within Kenya
- Coordinates: 0.42°S 36.3°E
- Country: Kenya
- County: Nakuru County
- Time zone: UTC+3 (EAT)

Kariandus is a settlement in Nakuru County, Kenya. It is located 17.5 miles from Nakuru town and 7.5 miles from Gilgil town. Human presence in the area dates back to the stone age. The present inhabitants of Kariandusi settled in the area in early 1980s in the former Lord Egerton cole and Lord Delamere ranches. The area has a well established tourism industry, with Kariandusi prehistoric site, Lake Elementaita, Several Hot Springs and booming hospitality industry providing the economic growth for the area.

Kariandusi is synonymous with the name used by the Maasai to refer to white paint traditionally used by Moran to paint their shields.
