= Mateka =

- Location within Kenya
- Coordinates: 0.54°N 34.5°E
- Country: Kenya
- County: Bungoma County
- Time zone: UTC+3 (EAT)
- Climate: Am

Mateka is a settlement in Kenya's Bungoma County, located at an elevation of 1,378 metres (4,521 ft). It lies approximately 8 kilometres southwest of Bungoma town and 9 kilometres southwest of Kanduyi.
