= Kalimoni =

- Location within Kenya
- Coordinates: 1.1°S 37.02°E
- Country: Kenya
- Province: Kiambu County
- Time zone: UTC+3 (EAT)

Kalimoni is a settlement in Kenya's Central Province. It is best known for the Kalimoni Mission Hospital ran by the Roman Catholic church. The hospital offers a wide variety of both inpatient and outpatient services.

== Hospital ==
Kalimoni Mission Hospital is licensed under the Medical Practitioners and Dentists Act Cap 253 to operate as a Hospital. It is a Catholic sponsored institution under the Archdiocese of Nairobi, and was started as dispensary in 1934 by the sisters of the precious blood, to meet the basic health needs (Mainly Outpatient) of the people of Juja and its environs.

In the year 2000, the dispensary was handed over to the Sisters of the congregation of the handmaids of the Holy Child Jesus to Manage. Since then the institution has made some steady progress and was elevated to a Level 4 Hospital status in November 2017.
