= Kipkabus =

Coordinates: 0°18′11″N 35°29′25″E

- Location within Kenya
- Country: Kenya
- Province: Rift Valley Province
- Time zone: UTC+3 (EAT)

Kipkabus is a settlement in Kenya's Rift Valley Province.
