= Railway stations in South Sudan =

Railways in Sudan

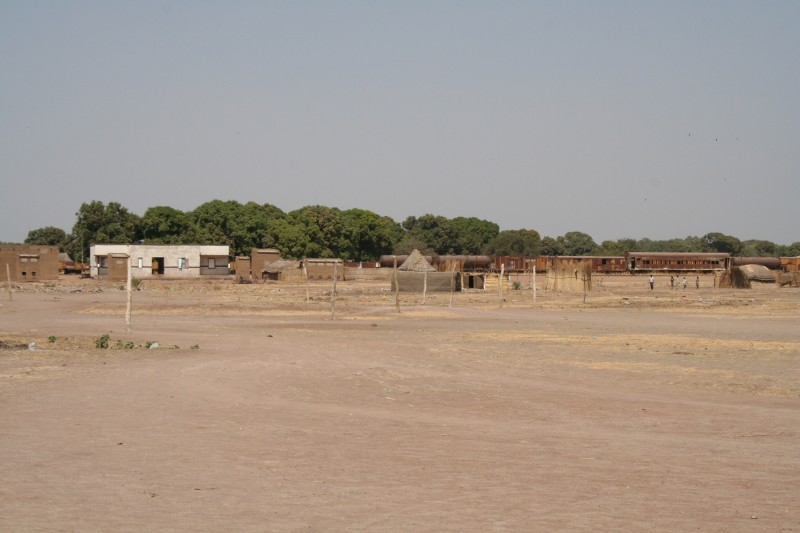
View of Aweil station

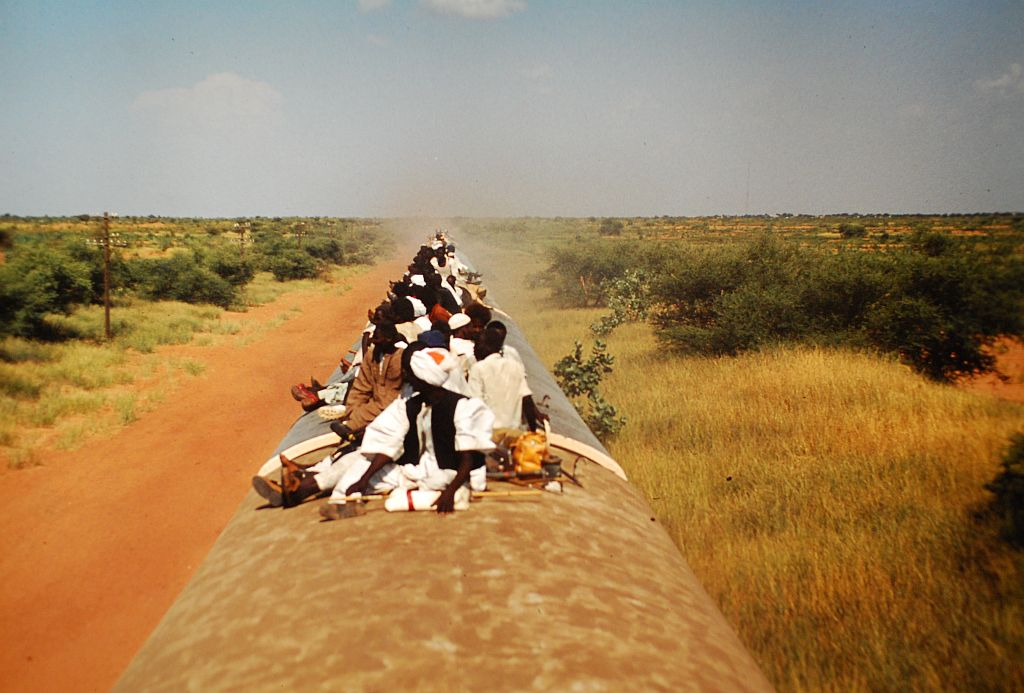
A train travelling towards Wau

All railway stations in South Sudan are on the Babonasa-Aweil-Wau line, which was built from 1959 to 1962. During the Second Sudanese Civil War, the line was badly damaged and parts of the line were mined. It was fully restored in 2010 with funding of $250 million from United Nations.

== Stations served by passenger trains ==
Station name	Route(s)
Aweil	Babonusa – Aweil

Station name	Route(s)
Wau	Aweil - Wau

=== Proposed ===
The Uganda Standard Gauge Railway will connect to Rwanda, South Sudan, and to the Mombasa–Nairobi Standard Gauge Railway whose construction is already underway. Nimule was selected as potentially being used as future Train station location.

== Maps ==
- UN Map
- UNHCR Map
- KRC Map of Kenya

== See also ==
- Lamu Port and Lamu-Southern Sudan-Ethiopia Transport Corridor
- Transport in South Sudan
- Railway stations in Sudan
- Railway stations in Kenya
