= Elangata Wuas =

- Location within Kenya
- Coordinates: 1.88°S 36.58°E
- Country: Kenya
- Province: Rift Valley Province

Population
  - Total: Estimated at 3,000
- Time zone: UTC+3 (EAT)

Elangata Wuas is a settlement in Rift Valley Province, Kenya.
