= Matathia =

Enoomatasiani
- Location within Kenya
- Coordinates: 1.4°S 36.68°E
- Country: Kenya
- Province: Rift Valley Province
- Time zone: UTC+3 (EAT)

Matathia is a village in Kiambu County in the western Rift Valley region of Kenya. It is located in the Kimende area of Lari Constituency.
