= Nakodok =

Town in Eastern Equatoria of South Sudan with a population of 4000

Nakodok is a small town in Eastern Equatoria, South Sudan, near the border with Kenya. The town had a population of about 3,498 as of May 2023.

== Transport ==
It lies on the route of a transport corridor for road, rail and oil connecting Lamu Port on the Indian Ocean and South Sudan. It was the site of a border dispute between South Sudan, Kenya and Uganda. Nakodok formerly had an airport, but it was demolished in 2016.
