= Taita-Taveta District =

Former district of Kenya

Coordinates: 3°20′S 38°15′E

Taita-Taveta District (formerly Taita District) was a district of Kenya, located in the Coast Province of the country. It lies approximately 200 km northwest of Mombasa city and 360 km southeast of Nairobi city.

The district was created by the colonial authorities in 1895 as Taita District, one of the original districts of Ukamba Province of the East Africa Protectorate. It included the Taveta sub-districts. In 1902, the district became part of Seyidiye Province headquartered at Mwatate, then Voi from 1911. In 1914, the Taveta sub-district was occupied by the Germans and was administered as part of the Moshi District of Tanganyika. After its reoccupation by the British in 1916, Taveta sub-district, was rejoined to Taita in 1921, with the entire district rejoining the Ukamba Province, till 1933 when it joined the Coast Province. In 1963, it was one of the forty districts of Kenya. It was later renamed to include 'Taveta'.

The population of the district in the 1980s was approximately 45,000 persons but this has shot up to well over 250,000 persons with population densities ranging from 3 persons per km^{2} to more than 800 persons per km^{2} due to the varied rainfall and terrain with the lower zones receiving an average of 440 mm of rainfall per annum and the highland areas receiving up to 1900 mm of rainfall. The altitude rises in range from 500 m above sea level to almost 2,300 above sea level at vuria peak which is the highest.

In 2007, the Taita-Taveta District was split into two sub districts: the Taita sub District and the Taveta sub District

== District land use ==
The district covered an area of 16,975 km^{2}. of which a bulk of 62% or 11,100 km^{2}. is within Tsavo East and Tsavo West National Parks. The remaining 5,876 km^{2} is occupied by ranches, sisal estates, water bodies such as Lakes Chala and Jipe in Taveta and mzima springs, and the hilltop forests which occupy less than 100 km^{2}. or approximately 10 km² out of 587.5 km².

The lowland areas of the district that are do not belong to national parks are divided to ranches, estates and wild life sanctuaries. The district has approximately 25 ranches. The main land use in ranche is cattle grazing. The three operating sisal estates of the district are the Teita Sisal Estate, Voi Sisal Estate and Taveta Sisal Estate. Many ranches utilize also wildlife tourism and conservation. The Taita Hills and Saltlick Lodges sanctuary is located in the district.

There are 48 forests which have survived on hill tops in the district of which 28 are gazetted and are under government protection and management. They range in size from small 500 square metres with a few remnant trees to modestly vast 2 square kilometres indigenous and exotic forest mountains. These forests are part of a unique Eastern Arch range of forests which are found mostly in Eastern Tanzania with the Taita Hills forming the only Kenyan Eastern Arc forest type in East Africa.

The Taita Hills forest hold a unique biodiversity with 13 taxa of plants and 9 taxa of animals found only in the Taita Hills and nowhere else in the world. In addition 22 plant species found in the Taita Hills forests are typical of the Eastern arc forests. The next being in eastern Tanzania. Some of the endemic African violet - Saintpaulia teitensis among others. Within these beautiful indigenous forests, bubble pure clean water to the lowland areas to cater to both human agricultural activities and wildlife in the Taita game sanctuary and Aruba dam in Tsavo East. The lower plains are thus supplied with water by the forests in the hills which are a good catchment of rains.

== Townships and villages ==
The capital of the district was small town of Wundanyi, though Voi was its largest town.

Local authorities (councils)
Authority	Type	Population*	Urban pop.*
Voi	Municipality	32,176	16,863
Taveta	Town	52,456	11,495
Taita-Taveta	County	162,039	8,032
Total	-	246,671	36,390
* 1999 census. Source:

Administrative divisions
Division	Population*	Urban pop.*	Headquarters
Mwambirwa	4,927	0	
Mwatate	56,365	3,386	Mwatate
Tausa	20,275	0	
Taveta	53,038	22,219	Taveta
Tsavo West N.P.	2,733	0	
Voi	54,562	15,382	Voi
Wundanyi	54,771	4,055	Wundanyi
Total	246,671	34,042	
* 1999 census. Sources: , ,

The district has four constituencies:

- Taveta Constituency
- Wundanyi Constituency
- Mwatate Constituency
- Voi Constituency
