= A23 road (Kenya) =

Major road in Kenya

Coordinates: 3.403758°S 37.891846°E

A23 Road
- A23 at the bottom of the map (Darker Green)

Route information
- Maintained by Kenya National Highways Authority
- Length: 110 km (68 mi) within Kenya

Major junctions
- East end: Voi
- West end: Taveta

Location
- Country: Kenya
- Counties: Taita-Taveta County

Highway system
- Transport in Kenya

Road route

The A23 is a major road in Kenya linking the towns of Voi and Taveta, before crossing the Tanzanian border (where it ceases to be classified as the A23) and serving the towns of Moshi and Arusha. The Taveta branch of the Uganda Railway runs along the road. It is part of the Arusha–Holili–Taveta–Voi Road.

== Towns ==
The following towns, listed from east towards the west, are located along the highway.

- Voi (junction to A109 road)
- Mwatate
- Bura
- Mashoti
- Maktau
- Mbuyuni
- Taveta (border town to Tanzania)

== See also ==
- Trans-African Highway network
