= Wesu District Hospital =

Government hospital in Taita-Taveta, Kenya

- Ministry of Medical Services, Kenya

Geography
- Location: Wundanyi, Taita-Taveta County, Kenya
- Coordinates: 3°24′35″S 38°21′18″E

Services
- Beds: 60

Links
- Lists: Hospitals in Kenya

Wesu District Hospital is a 60-bed government hospital in Kenya under the Ministry of Medical Services. It is located in the town of Wundanyi, Taita-Taveta County.

== Facilities ==
Services offered include Antenatal Care, Basic Emergency Obstetric Care, Curative In-patient Services, HIV Counselling and Testing, Immunization, Integrated Management of Childhood Illnesses, Prevention of Mother to Child transmission of HIV, Radiology Services e.g. X-ray and Tuberculosis Treatment.

== Disputes ==
In August 2009, disputes between the Ministry of Public Health and the Ministry of Medical Services had affected medical services in the hospital. The district development committee (DDC) was having difficulties making crucial decisions as the Ministry of Medical Services and that of Public Health and Sanitation were entangled in the row.

The Taita-Taveta District Public Health and Sanitation officer Shem Patta had a difficult time explaining the fate of Wesu District Hospital in Wundanyi after it was said to be understaffed and ill-equipped. Speaking during a DDC meeting in Wundanyi, Dr Patta said he was not able to comment on the status of the hospital. His counterpart in the Medical Services ministry was better placed to discuss the issue, he said. Although he was in charge before the Ministry of health was split into two, he said, he had scant information about the hospital, which the area MP Thomas Mwadeghu said was being neglected by the government. Earlier that year, there was a report that ants had infested the hospital's mortuary. Quoting a distressed resident, who claimed the ants had bitten the body of a relative and dug holes in it, as an example of the neglect in public hospitals. Further, the cooling facility at the hospital had broken down, meaning bodies couldn't be preserved.

Wesu had earlier been downgraded from a district hospital, putting a strain on its facilities. Although it was not expected that the ministries of Medical Services and Public Health and Sanitation would immediately fix the system that has been going downhill for decades, letting hospitals slip to the level of Wesu is unacceptable. Only radical surgery would solve such problems.

== Location ==
The hospital is located on the southern part of Kenya in Coast Province. The hospital is located 7 km away from the district headquarters, Wundanyi town, accessed by a long meandering earth road. The main mode of transport to the hospital is by motorcycle. The hospital lies on 3.6 hectares (8.9 acres) of land whose title is held by the county council of Taita-Taveta. There are three governmental district hospitals in Taita-Taveta district. One is located in Taveta, one in Wesu, and one in Voi.

== Demographics of served population ==
Most of the women in Mwatunge give birth at home, while women of Voi do it in the hospital. In Mwanda, most of the women have home births, but a few had delivered in the close by Wesu hospital. In the Taita-Taveta district, population growth is well below national and provincial averages. Reasons for this are seen to be higher education level of girls, which is then reflected in lower fertility rates. Out-migration also contributes to this, as educated and uneducated young people move to bigger cities to look for work. With future advances in health care and family planning, Taita Hills and Taita-Taveta might very well become a good example of sustainable population development. The fact remains, however, that the uphill area of Taita Hills is already densely populated.

== Component sub-units and equipment ==
The hospital complex consists of:

- An outpatient block with pharmacy, consultation rooms, injection room, MCH/FP clinic, Child Welfare Clinic, Mental Health Clinic, dental room, Comprehensive Care Clinic(C.C.C.) and records building—the latter has not been occupied as it is incomplete and needs to be redesigned.
- An administration block with Accounts/N.H.I.F. office, Health Administrative Office, Medical Superintendent Office, Nursing Officer in-charge office, Telephone Operator Office, Personnel office, Computer Room, and Board Room. This block is one of the old buildings earmarked for rehabilitation upon availability of development funds.
- Medical Engineering Services Department (MESD) block with workshop—an old building for rehabilitation.
- Supplies department block with non-pharmaceuticals stores, bulk drug stores and supplies office; old building for rehabilitation.
- An X-ray Unit; renovated in 2006.
- An ultramodern theatre complex recently renovated in 2006.
- A maternity Unit with labour ward and neonatal unit; renovated in 2006.
- A Laboratory and Physiotherapy block.
- A Kitchen and Laundry Block
- An Occupational Therapy block which is the oldest building in the institution built in 1954 as the first maternity unit. It needs to be rehabilitated and then better utilised with many free rooms.
- Wards which include 2 general wards (male and female/paediatrics) and isolation ward which is unoccupied.
- A mortuary block which is located in the far southern end of the hospital accessed from the hospital entrance.
- Other buildings are staff house quarters which are under the Ministry of Housing and also local government housing units. A majority are occupied but are not in a well maintained state. There is need for the hospital management to plan for renovating them.

The hospital is not fully equipped as per the K.E.P.H. (Kenya Essential Package for Health) standards for offering of essential medical services. There is a 65 KVA generator, donated by PLAN International, which broke down in early 2009. There has been a concerted effort to try to repair it but the pace is slow and funding is unavailable. The mortuary coolers, four in number, are in good working condition after being renovated in July 2009. The institution has two hospital vehicles donated by the Danish international development agency (DANIDA) that are serviceable and in good working order. They include an ambulance Land Cruiser and a double-cabin pick-up vehicle.

Overall the performance rating for the hospital is average; however, there is much room for improvement.
