= Marsden Madoka =

Kenyan politician and businessman (born 1943)

The Honourable Marsden Madoka EGH

Minister of State for Provincial Administration and National Security
- In office 2003–2004
- President: Mwai Kibaki
- Succeeded by: John Michuki

Minister for Foreign Affairs
- In office 2000–2002
- President: Daniel arap Moi
- Preceded by: Chris Obure
- Succeeded by: Kalonzo Musyoka

Assistant Minister for Foreign Affairs
- In office 1998–2000
- President: Daniel arap Moi

Member of Parliament for Mwatate Constituency
- In office 1997–2007
- Preceded by: Eliud Mwakio Mcharo
- Succeeded by: Calist Andrew Mwatela

Personal details
- Born: Marsden Herman Madoka; 15 March 1943 (age 83) Mwatate, Taita District, Coast Province, Kenya Colony
- Spouse: Elizabeth Mumbi Madoka
- Occupation: Politician, Businessman, Former Military Officer

Military service
- Branch/service: Kenya Army
- Rank: Major

Marsden Herman Madoka (born 15 March 1943) is a Kenyan statesman, businessman, and former military officer. He has served in various capacities in both public service and private sectors, including as Minister of State for Provincial Administration and National Security, Minister for Foreign Affairs, and Assistant Minister for Foreign Affairs. Madoka is renowned for his contributions to Kenya's governance, sports development, and education.

== Early life and education ==
Madoka was born in Mwatate, Taita District in the Coast Province of Kenya Colony. He attended Hospital Hill Primary School and later Shimo La Tewa High School. He furthered his studies through the Outward Bound Kenya programme, known for developing leadership and resilience skills.

== Military career ==
Madoka began his career in the Kenya Army, eventually rising to the rank of Major. In 1966, at just 22 years old, he became the first Aide-de-Camp (ADC) to President Jomo Kenyatta.

== Political career ==
Madoka transitioned from military service to politics, becoming the Member of Parliament (MP) for Mwatate Constituency in 1997; a position he held until 2007. His notable positions include:

- Minister of State for Provincial Administration and National Security (2003–2004)
- Minister for Foreign Affairs (2000–2002)
- Assistant Minister for Foreign Affairs (1998–2000)

== Business and leadership ==
In addition to his political roles, Madoka has held various positions in business. He served as General Manager of New Products at East African Breweries Limited (EABL). Later, he became Chairman of the Kenya Ports Authority and Chairman of Outward Bound Kenya, championing youth empowerment and leadership development.

== Philanthropy and sports development ==
Madoka is the founder of the annual Madoka Half Marathon, a prominent event aimed at promoting sports and fostering community development in Taita-Taveta County. Sponsored by organisations such as Safaricom and the Kenya Ports Authority, the marathon has nurtured local athletic talent.

== Personal life ==
Madoka is married to Elizabeth Mumbi Madoka, who was crowned Miss Uhuru in 1963 and served as President Kenyatta's longest-serving secretary. The couple has been celebrated for their contributions to Kenya's national development.

== Honours and awards ==
In 1988, Madoka was appointed a Member of the Venerable Order of Saint John (MStJ), followed by promotions to Commander (CStJ) in 2004, Knight (KStJ) in 2012, and finally Bailiff Grand Cross of the Order (GCStJ) in 2020.

He was also conferred the class of Elder in the Order of the Golden Heart of Kenya (EGH), the country’s highest national honour.
