= List of ranches, estates and sanctuaries in Taita-Taveta County =

The large scale land use units of the Taita-Taveta County consists of 21 ranching units, two wildlife sanctuaries and three sisal estates.

== Wildlife sanctuaries ==
- Taita Hills Wildlife Sanctuary
- LUMO Community Wildlife Sanctuary

== Ranches ==
- Amaka Ranch
- Bura Ranch
- Choke Ranch
- Dawida Ranch
- Kambanga Ranch
- Kasigau Ranch
- Kishushe Cooperative Ranch
- Kishamba B
- Kutima Ranch
- Lualenyi Private Ranch
- Maungu Ranch
- Mbale Ranch
- Mbulia Ranch
- Mgeno Ranch
- Mramba Ranch
- Mwasui Ranch
- Ndara Ranch: It's a Trust land found on the slopes of the Sagalla hills. Also referred to as "Nyika".
- Oza Ranch
- Rukinga Ranch
- Sagalla Ranch
- Taita Ranch [Taita Private Ranch]
- Wushumbu Ranch

== Estates ==
- Kidai Sisal Estate (not operational)
- Taveta Sisal Estate
- Teita Sisal Estate
- Voi Sisal Estate
