= Granton Samboja =

Kenyan politician

2nd Governor of Taita-Taveta County
- In office 21 August 2017 – 25 August 2022
- President: Uhuru Kenyatta
- Deputy: William Ruto

Personal details
- Born: Taita-Taveta County
- Party: Jubilee Party of Kenya
- Website: https://web.facebook.com/Mshapa006/

Granton Graham Samboja is a Kenyan politician and media executive who served as the second governor of Taita Taveta County from 2017 to 2022. He is a member of the Jubilee Party of Kenya. Samboja capitalized on his background in the media and his links with President Uhuru Kenyatta to get into politics. His education background remains the subject of controversy.

== Early life ==
Granton Samboja is of Taita ethnicity, with his rural origins being the Werugha area of Taita Taveta County in Kenya. Werugha sits among the peaks of the Taita Hills. Samboja's education background is the subject of controversy, but an online news outlet reports that he attended the state-owned Kenya Institute of Mass Communication (KIMC).

== Media career ==
Samboja joined the Royal Media Services on completing his studies at KIMC. He eventually left to start Milele FM. Records indicate Milele FM was founded in 2008. In addition to being the founder of Milele FM, Samboja owns Anguo FM, a Taita language radio station.

== Political life ==
Granton Samboja is said to be close friends with President Uhuru Kenyatta. It was therefore not surprising when, in April 2015, the president appointed Samboja as chairman of the Coast Water Services Board. Samboja resigned in February 2017 to venture into active politics.

== Governor of Taita Taveta County ==
Granton Samboja was elected the second governor of Taita Taveta county during the 2017 general elections held on 8 August that year. He was sworn into office on 21 August 2017 at an inauguration ceremony where his predecessor John Mruttu, was present.

=== Controversy over academic qualifications ===
As soon as Governor Samboja was inaugurated, controversies emerged over whether he had a university degree. Electoral law as applied in the 2017 general elections explicitly stated that a candidate for governor should have had a degree from a university recognized in Kenya. Court cases were filed in both Nairobi and Mombasa seeking to nullify Samboja's election on grounds that he did not have a university degree. During court proceedings, copies of academic certificates the governor claimed he had earned from Kenyatta University were declared fake. The university submitted an affidavit stating that Samboja, “had not applied for, obtained admission or attended the institution as a student for a certificate, diploma and degree in Project Management, Human Resource Management and Bachelor of Commerce respectively.” The court cases eventually fizzled out and Samboja remained in office.

=== Petition to dissolve the county assembly ===
In July 2019, Governor Granton Samboja initiated a petition to have President Uhuru Kenyatta dissolve the county assembly of Taita Taveta. Samboja was angered by a disagreement with the county assembly over allocations totalling 5.3 billion Kenya Shillings for the 2019/2020 budget. Samboja accused members of the county assembly of unilaterally allocating millions of shillings to their electoral wards. On its part, the county assembly accused Samboja of allocating county government funds to non-crucial functions.

In October 2019, Samboja's petition was handed over to President Uhuru Kenyatta who then forwarded it to the Independent Electoral and Boundaries Commission (IEBC) for verification of the petitioners’ signatures. Under the law, IEBC had to confirm if the signatures met the legal threshold that a petition to dissolve the county assembly be supported by at least 10% of registered voters in the county. In this particular case, the petition needed at least 15,500 verified signatures because the total number of registered voters in Taita Taveta County was 155,000. On 6 November 2019, IEBC announced that Samboja's petition had the support of 21,861 registered voters, confirming that it had met the required threshold. The governor's supporters saw this as a victory.

=== Impeachment by the County Assembly ===
As Governor Samboja carried out his plan to dissolve the county assembly, the members of the assembly were plotting a counter-move: impeaching the governor. The plot came to a fruition on October 9, 2019 when 30 out of 33 members of the county assembly (MCAs) voted to impeach Samboja.

The passing of the motion of impeachment in the county assembly kicked of a flurry of court cases aimed at stopping the impeachment process from going to the National Senate. Under Kenya's 2010 Constitution, the Senate has final say to either uphold or reject the impeachment. On October 22, 2019, the Senate resolved to proceed with the impeachment proceedings despite court cases blocking proceedings on the matter. Two days later, the Senate cleared Governor Granton Samboja of the allegations raised by the county assembly. This allowed him to continue his tenure in office.

=== Border disputes with neighbouring counties ===
Taita Taveta County has long standing border disagreements with Makueni and Kwale counties. The dispute with Makueni county is over which county should be collecting taxes in Mtito Andei township which lies on the border. A similar dispute with Kwale revolves around Mackinnon Road township. Officials of the Taita Taveta county government say lost revenue due to the border disputes could be as much as 60 million Kenya Shillings annually.

On July 11, 2020, Governor Samboja and Kwale governor Salim Mvurya met and agreed to form a joint technical committee of surveyors to resolve the border dispute.

On July 4, 2020, Samboja surprised the county by signing a resolution agreement for a little-known border dispute with Kajiado county. The agreement to resolve a border dispute at Rongo was signed by Samboja and Kajiado county governor Joseph Ole Lenku. The agreement quickly fell into controversy when local leaders demanded that it be made public.

=== Crisis in the health sector ===
Governor Granton Samboja inherited a public health system plagued by years of chronic underfunding, corruption and workers’ strikes. The situation affects all of the counties of Kenya. A policy brief published by KEMRI Wellcome Trust in June 2020 indicates that health workers’ discontent and unrest worsened after 2013 when public health functions were devolved from the national government to county governments. A pattern developed in which health workers go on strike but return to work with their concerns remaining largely unresolved. The reason given by doctors and nurses for the numerous strikes is failure by county governments to implement Collective Bargaining Agreements (CBAs) with their respective unions.

=== Management of county markets ===
One of the first programs in Governor Granton Samboja's administration was to upgrade the open air markets in Taita Taveta county. During the upgrade, traders at those markets had to be relocated to new locations far away from their customers. This sparked off protests.

In March 2018, traders in Voi town were relocated to a site more than two kilometres away from the town centre. The market in Voi town was upgraded and officially opened by Deputy President William Ruto on October 1, 2018. However, it took more than two years for the county government to connect the new structures to electricity. Similar market upgrading projects in Wundanyi, Mwatate and Taveta towns resulted in huge losses to the business community.

Governor Samboja got into trouble with traders at Mghange market in March 2020 when he ordered that the market be closed on Sundays because it is a day for worship.

=== Stand on sale of khat ===
In September 2019, Governor Granton Samboja banned the sale of khat leaves in Taita Taveta County. The leaves, popular known as muguka, are a cheap stimulant chewed by young men throughout Kenya. The chewing of khat and its leaves has been blamed for creating a culture of idleness among young men. Enforcement of the ban was however not sustained and consumption of khat continues.

=== Handling of disputes between camel herders and farmers ===
Conflict between camel herders mostly from the Somali community and farmers in Taita Taveta county had been simmering for years. In 2018, the county government of Taita Taveta halted the issuance of grazing licenses and ordered camel herders out of the county. In July 2019, Governor Samboja was among politicians summoned by the Directorate of Criminal Investigations to record statements over his remarks amidst clashes between Somali herders and local farmers. The previous month, a farmer was killed allegedly by camel herders. In retaliation, the slain man's community attacked and killed at least 20 camels. The tension between camel herders and farmers remains unresolved.

=== Sand harvesting ===
Governor Samboja banned sand harvesting in December 2019 after several homes were destroyed by floods along the Voi River. Samboja blamed sand harvesting for the flooding. The ban on sand harvesting was lifted in March 2020 but tough conditions were set for those wanting to participate in the business. Among the conditions was the formation of sand harvesting cooperative societies at the various locations where sand is harvested. The cooperatives have to seek environmental impact assessment for the sand harvesting sites and that each truckload of sand pay cess levies to the county government.

=== Stand on sharing of revenue from Tsavo National Park ===
Samboja has several times reiterated his stand that Taita Taveta county must get a bigger share of revenue from Tsavo National Park. The park is the largest wildlife conservation area in Kenya and occupies over 60% of Taita Taveta county. “The county notes with concern that despite Article 69(1) granting our people access to revenue generated from natural resources, no guidelines have been put in place to ensure that our people benefit from the revenue collected from the Tsavo National Park,” Samboja told the National Senate on July 15, 2020.

=== Election as Chairman, Jumuiya ya Kaunti za Pwani ===
Governor Granton Samboja was elected chairman of the coastal economic bloc on 10 February 2021. The economic bloc, known in Swahili as the Jumuiya ya Kaunti za Pwani (JKP), consists of the six counties at the Kenyan coast. The member counties are Kilifi, Kwale, Lamu, Mombasa, Taita Taveta and Tana River.

=== 2022 gubernatorial campaign ===
Samboja ran for re-election in the 2022 general elections but lost to Andrew Mwadime "Wakujaa." Samboja's term as governor ended on 25 August 2022 when Wakujaa was inaugurated as the third governor of Taita Taveta county.
