= Ngangao Forest =

Forest in Kenya

Coordinates: 03°22′S 038°20′E

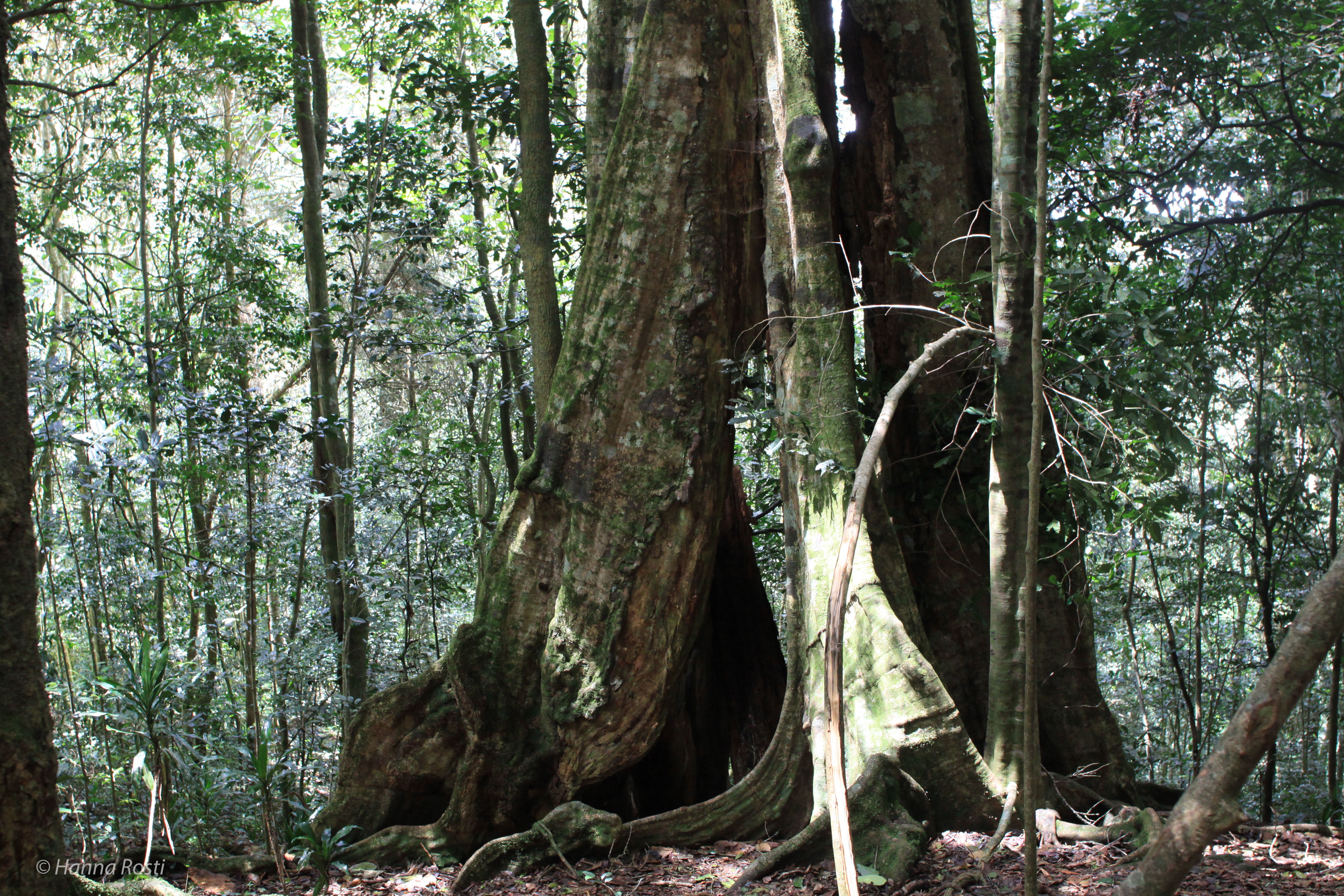
Cave tree from Ngangao Forest

Ngangao Forest is one of the few remaining indigenous cloud forest fragments of the Taita Hills, Kenya. It is located on a rock surrounded by the villages of Makandenyi, Maghimbinyi, Mgambonyi and Kitumbi. It lies 10 km from Wundanyi and can easily be reached by road. There is even frequent public transport from Wundanyi to Makandenyi (at least 10 vehicles daily). The very basic "Ngangao forest camp" is located next to the forester's house at the edge of forest.

With its 120 hectares (297 acres), Ngangao is the second largest forest and one of the lesser disturbed forests of the Taita Hills. As a result, it is a stronghold for many plant and animal species. There are three endemic birds species of the Taita Hills. The Taita thrush (Turdus (olivaceus) helleri), Taita apalis (Apalis (thoracica) fuscigularis) and Taita white-eye (Zosterops (poliogaster) silvanus) occur in relative large numbers. Some plants, like the Zimmermannia ovata, are only found in the dryer parts of Ngangao Forest.
