= Calist Andrew Mwatela =

Kenyan politician and educator

Member of the East African Legislative Assembly
- In office 2001–2006
- Constituency: Kenya

Member of the National Assembly of Kenya
- In office 2007–2013

Personal details
- Born: 1947 (age 78–79) Tungulu, Bura, Taita-Taveta County, Kenya
- Occupation: Politician, Educator

Calist Andrew Mwatela (born 1947) is a Kenyan politician and educator. From 2001 to 2006, he represented Kenya as a member of the East African Legislative Assembly. He represented the Mwatate Constituency in the National Assembly of Kenya on an Orange Democratic Movement ticket. He was elected in 2007, but was unable to defend his seat in the 2013 general election.

He was born in Tungulu village in Bura, Taita-Taveta County. He worked as a primary school teacher, and during this time, he authored several school textbooks. He joined active politics, vying for the Mwatate seat with the Democratic Party of Kenya, then led by former Kenyan president Mwai Kibaki. He is married to Jacinta Mwatela, who served as deputy governor at the Central Bank of Kenya from 2005 to 2008.

He served as the assistant minister for Education during his term as member of parliament.
