= John Mruttu =

Kenyan politician

John Mtuta Mruttu

First Governor of Taita-Taveta County
- In office 27 March 2013 – 21 August 2017
- President: Uhuru Kenyatta

Personal details
- Born: July 1, 1955 (age 70) Taita-Taveta County
- Party: Independent

John Mtuta Mruttu (born July 1, 1955, in Taita Taveta, Kenya) is a Kenyan politician. He is former county governor of Taita-Taveta County in Kenya. He was elected into office in 2013 during the Kenya general elections.

== Early life and education ==
Born John Mtuta Mruttu on July 1, 1955. He was born in Taita-Taveta county in Kenya. Mruttu attended his high school at Kenyatta High School, Taita. In 1977 he enrolled into University of Nairobi where he studied mechanical engineering and graduated in 1980 with a Bachelor of Science. In 2008 he also received an MBA from the University of Nairobi.

== Career ==
Mruttu started his career as a Chief engineer at Kenya Petroleum Refineries Limited in 2000, during his time there he was responsible for all engineering activities in the company. He served in that role for three years and was thereafter promoted to Manufacturing and Deputy general manager of Kenya Petroleum Refineries Limited. In 2006 he was again promoted to general manager/CEO of Kenya Petroleum Refineries Ltd. In 2012 he was made chief operating officer of the firm and finally left in 2012 to politics.

In 2013 he ran for office of the Governor of Taita-Taveta county and was elected as Governor.

In 2017 he lost re-election to Granton Samboja.

He was appointed as the Chairperson of the Agricultural Finance Corporation Board on 18th November, 2022
