= Arusha–Holili–Taveta–Voi Road =

Road in Kenya

Coordinates: 03°22′49″S 37°38′31″E

Route information
- Length: 140 mi (230 km)

Major junctions
- West end: Arusha
- Moshi; Holili; Taveta
- East end: Voi

Location
- Country: Tanzania

Highway system
- Transport in Tanzania

Arusha–Holili–Taveta–Voi Road (A23) is a road in Tanzania and Kenya, connecting the towns of Arusha, Moshi, and Holili in Tanzania with Taveta and Voi in Kenya.

== Location ==
The western end of the A23 road is in Arusha, Tanzania at its junction with the A104 road. The A23 road connects eastward with Moshi and the border town of Holili. Further east in Kenya, the A23 road connects with Taveta and has its eastern terminus in Voi at the intersection with the A109 Nairobi–Mombasa Road. The A23 road from end to end measures approximately 230 kilometres (140 mi).

== Upgrades and reconstruction ==
The A23 road forms an important link in the Voi–Dodoma / Singida corridor (consisting of the A23, A104, B141, and B143 roads).

The African Development Bank is lending US$232.5 million towards upgrading the A23 road, constituting 89.1 percent of the budgeted total cost. Kenya is contributing US$15.6 million, while Tanzania is contributing US$12.3 million.

Construction of the A23 double carriage way between Arusha and Tengeru, Tanzania began in July 2013. The contractor is Hanil-Jiangsu JV, a South Korean construction company, The Cheil Engineering Company, also from South Korea, is the consulting engineer. Phase 2 of the project includes the upgrade to double carriage way of the road between Tengeru and Usa River, Tanzania. This work should be completed by December 2018. Reconstructing the two-lane road connecting Usa River, Moshi, and Holili was part of Phase 2 originally. A lack of funds, however, means that the reconstruction "is not in the immediate implementation plan" except that realigning the approaches to the Kikafu River bridge is still planned. The design for a replacement bridge has been completed.

Work on the Kenyan side of the A23 road commenced in May 2014, with Tanzanian President Jakaya Kikwete and Kenyan President Uhuru Kenyatta officially launching the project in September 2015. Completion was scheduled for May 2017.

== See also ==
- List of roads in Kenya
- List of roads in Tanzania
