= Taveta Constituency =

Parliamentary constituency in Kenya

Taveta
- constituency for the Parliament of Kenya
- Taveta Constituency within Taita/Taveta County

- Taita/Taveta County within Kenya
- County: Taita–Taveta County
- Population: 91,222
- Area: 6,399 km^{2} (2,470.7 sq mi)

Current constituency
- Number of members: 1
- Party: Wiper
- Member of Parliament: John Okano Bwire
- Wards: 5

Taveta Constituency is an electoral constituency in Kenya. It is one of four constituencies in Taita-Taveta County and was established for the 1966 elections. The constituency has five county assembly wards, all belonging to the Taita-Taveta County.

== Members of Parliament ==
Elections	MP	Party	Notes
1966	Alexander Harry Dingiria	KANU	
1969	D. J. Mnene	KANU	One-party system
1974	Mwacharo Kubo	KANU	One-party system
1979	Mwacharo Kubo	KANU	One-party system
1983	Norman Nthenge Lukindo	KANU	One-party system.
1988	Mwacharo Kubo	KANU	One-party system
1992	Basil Criticos	KANU	
1997	Basil Criticos	KANU	
2001	Jackson Mwalulu	DP	By-election
2002	Naomi Shaban	KANU	
2007	Naomi Shaban	KANU	10th Parliament of kenya
2013	Naomi Shaban	Jubilee coalition	11th Parliament of Kenya
2017	Naomi Shaban	Jubilee party	12th Parliament of Kenya
2022	John Okano Bwire	Wiper	13th Parliament of Kenya

== Locations and wards ==
Locations
Location	Population*
Bomani	24,931
Chala	8,580
Jipe	6,926
Kimorigho	11,420
Njukini	7,883
Total	x
1999 census.

Wards
Ward	Registered Voters
Chala/Njukini	5,141
Kitobo / Kimorigho	4,237
Mahoo	2,551
Mboghoni / Kimalamata	4,543
Taveta North	3,623
Taveta South	1,851
Total	21,946
*September 2005.
