= LUMO Community Wildlife Sanctuary =

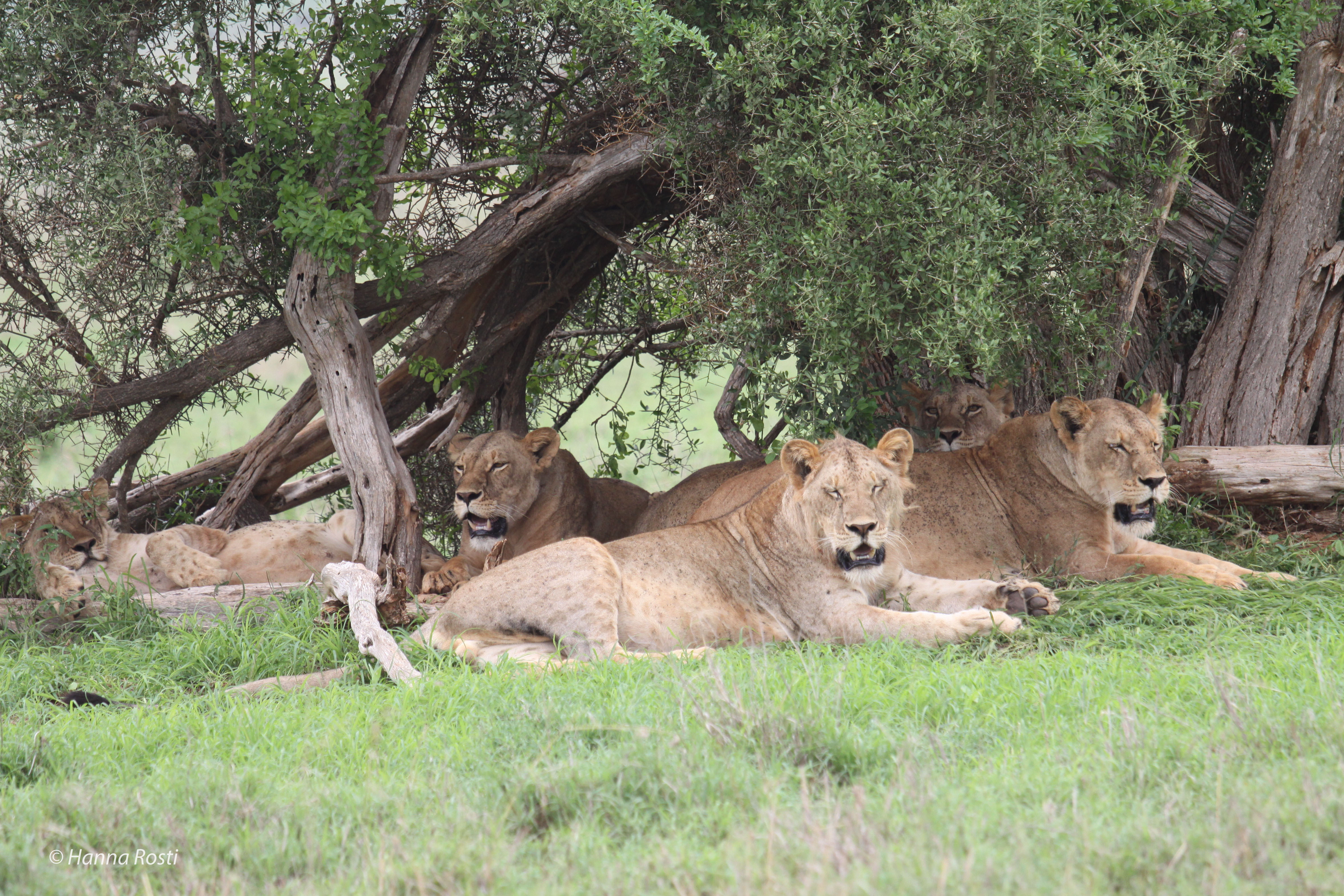

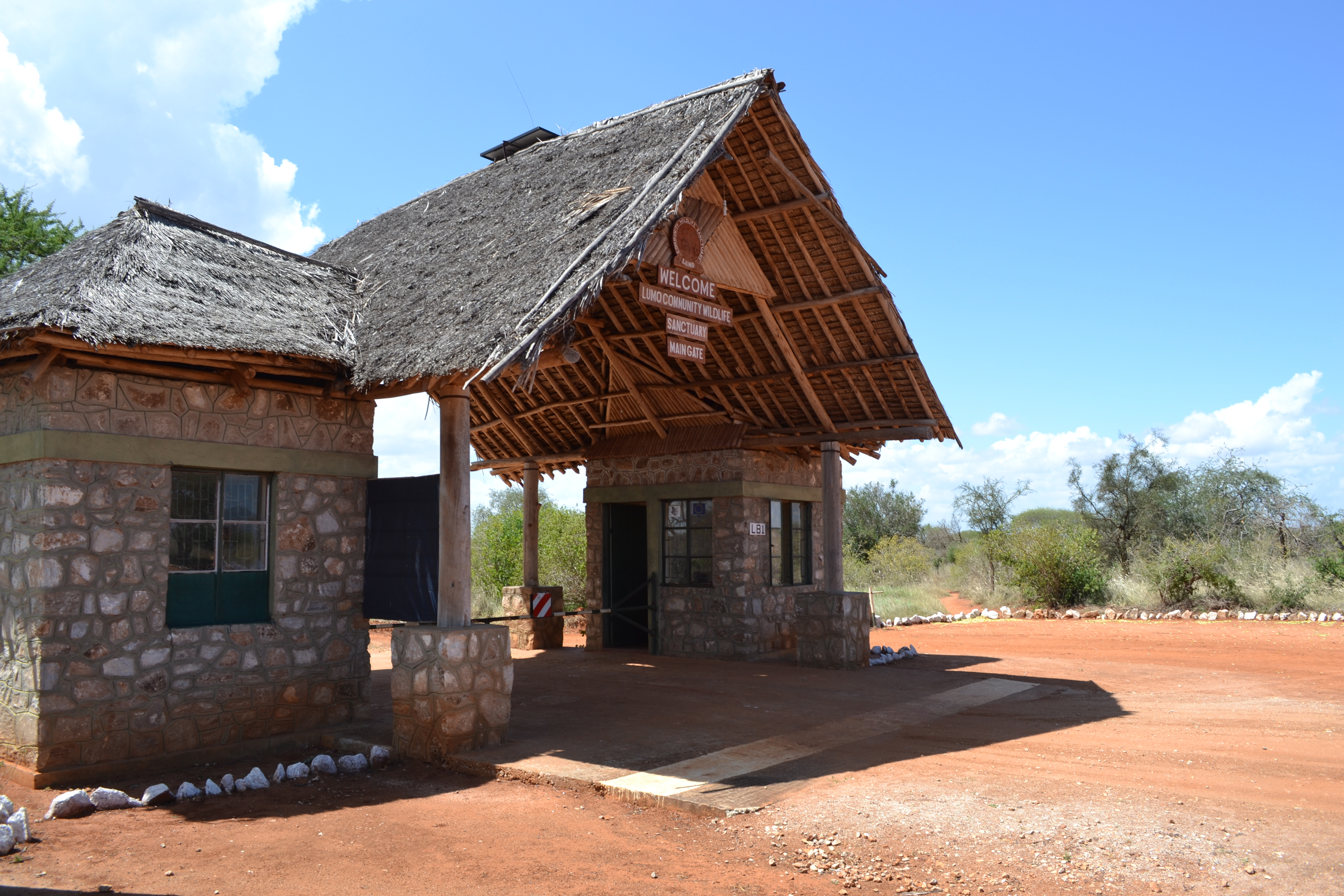
Main entrance to the sanctuary

LUMO Community Wildlife Sanctuary is a community-led wildlife conservation initiative in Kenya. It is located near Mwatate in Taita-Taveta County in the former Coast Province, approximately 220 km (140 mi) from Mombasa. It covers an area of 190 km^{2} (73 sq mi). The sanctuary is formed by the Lualenyi, Mramba Communal Grazing Area, and Oza Community land, hence the acronym "LUMO".

LUMO Community Wildlife Sanctuary is adjacent to Tsavo West National Park and the Taita Hills Wildlife Sanctuary. Driven by a commitment to transparency and accountability, the conservancy engages stakeholders at all levels, from local communities to international partners, in decision-making processes and collaborative initiatives. By fostering partnerships, promoting sustainable tourism, and implementing effective conservation strategies, LUMO Conservancy aims to create a harmonious balance between the needs of wildlife and the well-being of surrounding communities.

One of the hallmark features of LUMO are: Soroi Lions Bluff Lodge, Soroi Cheetah Tented Camp and Soroi Leopard Lair Cottages, which are world-class tourism facilities providing guests with immersive safari experiences while supporting conservation initiatives and empowering nearby communities.
