= Mwatate Constituency =

Electoral constituency

Mwatate
- constituency for the Parliament of Kenya
- Mwatate Constituency within Taita-Taveta County

- Taita-Taveta County within Kenya
- County: Taita-Taveta
- Population: 81,659
- Area: 2,723 km^{2} (1,051.4 sq mi)

Current constituency
- Number of members: 1
- Party: JP
- Member of Parliament: Peter Mbogho Shake
- Wards: 5

Mwatate Constituency is an electoral constituency in Kenya. It is one of four constituencies in Taita-Taveta County and was established for the 1988 elections.

== Members of Parliament ==
Elections	MP	Party	Notes
1988	Eliud Mwakio Mcharo	KANU	One-party system
1992	Eliud Mwakio Mcharo	KANU	
1997	Marsden Herman Madoka	KANU	
2002	Marsden Herman Madoka	KANU	
2007	Calist Andrew Mwatela	ODM	10th Parliament of Kenya
2013	Andrew Mwadime	ODM	11th Parliament of Kenya
2017	Andrew Mwadime	ODM	12th Parliament of Kenya
2022	Peter Mbogho Shake	Jubilee	13th Parliament of Kenya

== Locations and wards ==
Locations
Location	Population*
Chawia	6,513
Bura	10,931
Kidaya Ngerenyi	5,189
Kishamba	7.822
Mwachabo	12,006
Mwakitau	8,179
Mwatate	13,849
Rong'e	3,449
Rong'e Juu	3,671
Total	x
1999 census.

Wards
Ward	Registered Voters	Local Authority
Kighononyi	1,145	Voi municipality
Bura	4,725	Taita-Taveta County
Chawia / Kishamba	8,724	Taita-Taveta County
Mwachabo	5,017	Taita-Taveta County
Mwakitau	3,259	Taita-Taveta County
Mwatate	5,194	Taita-Taveta County
Rong'e	1,726	Taita-Taveta County
Rong'e Juu	1,840	Taita-Taveta County
Total	31,630	
*September 2005.
