= Bura, Kenya =

Bura, Kenya may refer to:

- Bura, Tana River County, Kenya
- Bura, Taita-Taveta County, Kenya
