= Arthur Wallace McGregor =

British Christian missionary (1863–1931)

Arthur Wallace McGregor (1863 – June 9, 1931) was a British Christian missionary, Royal Army Chaplain and lexicographer. McGregor is mostly known for his work in Kenya Kikuyu territories. McGregor arrived in Kenya in 1892 with the CMS Missionary Society Taveta, Thungiri, Nairobi. Bicycling from kabete, he was the first minister of the European congregation in Nairobi around 1900. McGregor founded the Weithaga and Kahuhia (1906) Missions in the early 1900s. He was still working in Kenya in 1918. McGregor is mostly known for his English-Kiguyu dictionary.

McGregor was born in Cirencester, England and baptized on September 25, 1863. He died in Banbury on June 9, 1931.
