= Lualenyi Ranch =

Coordinates: 3°38′37.41″S 38°15′39.15″E

Lualenyi Ranch is a private group ranch in Kenya. The ranch is located in Taita-Taveta County next to the Tsavo West National Park and Taita Hills Wildlife Sanctuary. The ranch covers approximately 430 km^{2} (170 sq mi). It has been leased from the government for 99 years. Lualenyi Ranch is part of the LUMO Community Wildlife Sanctuary with Oza and Mramba ranches.
