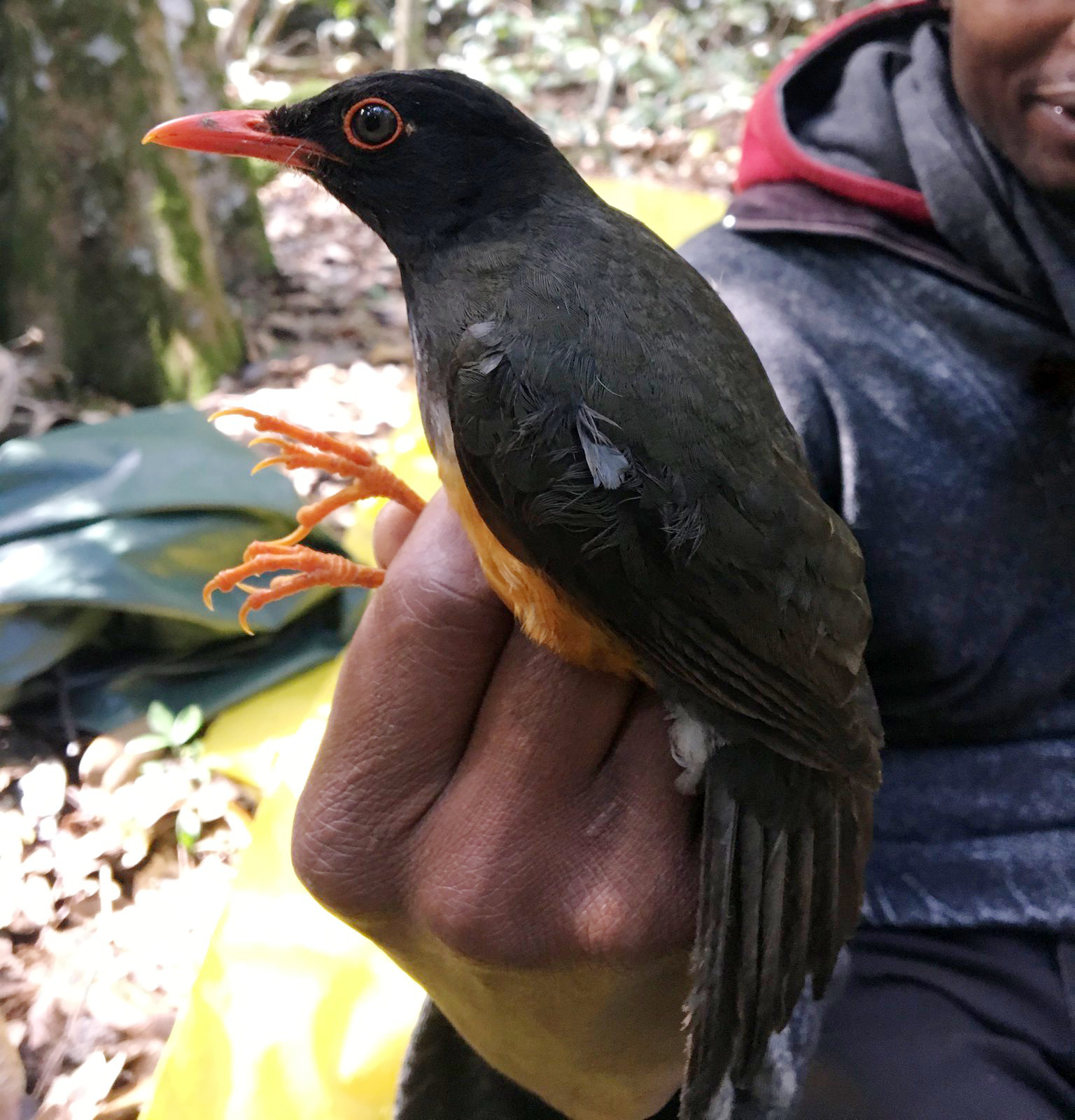
- in Taita-Taveta County, Kenya

Conservation status
- Endangered (IUCN 3.1)

Scientific classification
- Kingdom: Animalia
- Phylum: Chordata
- Class: Aves
- Order: Passeriformes
- Family: Turdidae
- Genus: Turdus
- Species: T. helleri

Binomial name
- Turdus helleri (Mearns, 1913)
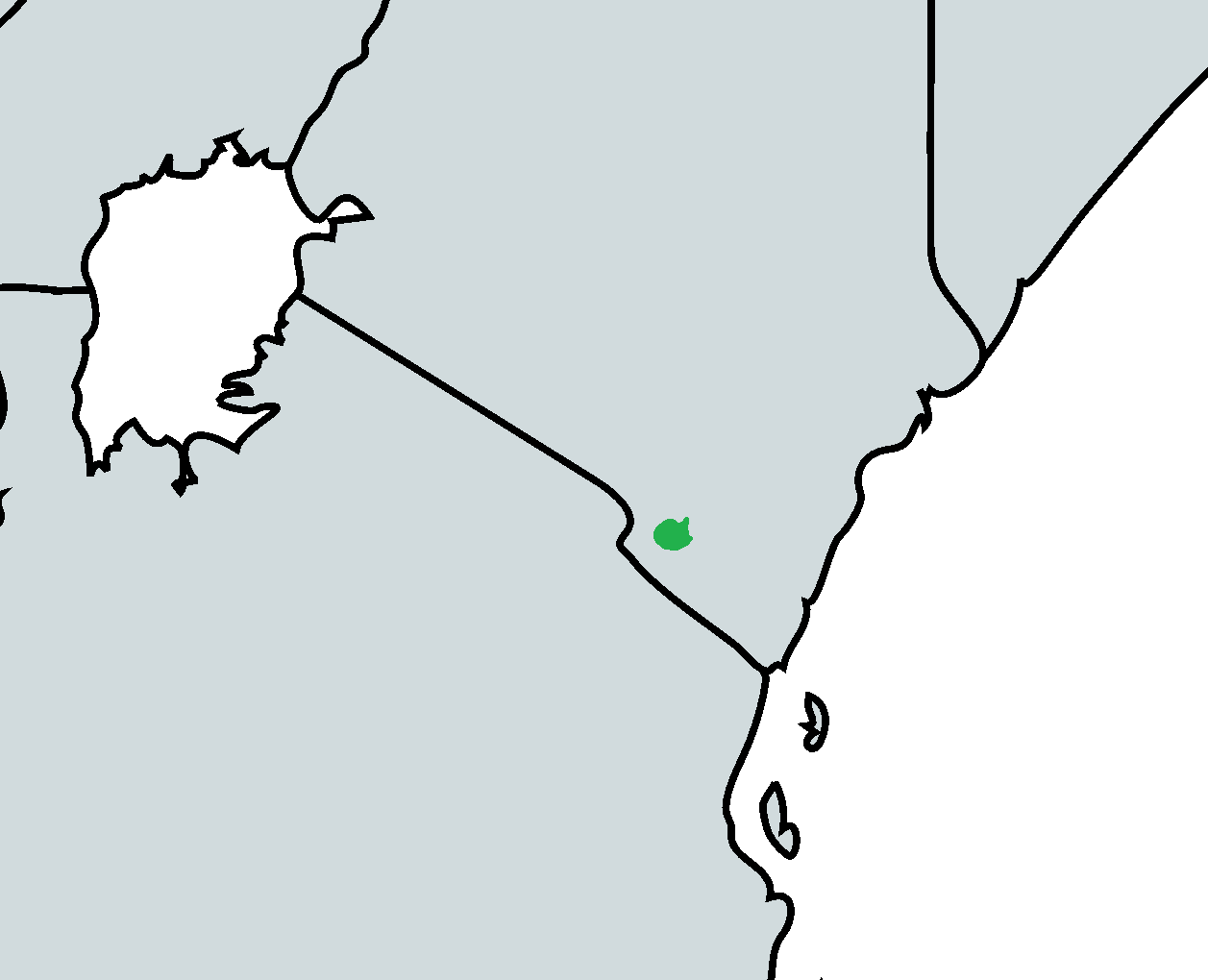

Synonyms
- Turdus olivaceus helleri

= Taita thrush =

Species of bird

The Taita thrush (Turdus helleri), also known as the Taita olive thrush or Heller's ground thrush, is an endangered bird in the thrush family Turdidae, endemic to the Taita Hills in southern Kenya.

== Description ==
The Taita thrush was previously classified as subspecies of the olive thrush (Turdus olivaceus), but it is now treated as distinct species. It reaches a length between 20 and 22 centimetres. The head and upperparts are dark grey-brown to black, the breast is grey, the underparts are white, and the flanks are rufous-red. The eye is dark with a narrow yellow or orange eye-ring, and the bill and legs are bright orange. It was named after the zoologist Edmund Heller (1875–1939), a workmate of the American ornithologist Edgar Alexander Mearns (1856–1916) who first described this species in 1913.

== Distribution ==
The Taita thrush is a forest-dependent endemic bird confined to four forests in the Taita Hills in the south east of Kenya: Mbololo, Chawia, Yale and Ngangao. The forests cover a tiny 342 ha. Conservationists are using birds, with the thrush as the flagship species, to champion the conservation of the Taita Hills forests.

== Ecology ==
It is restricted to montane moist forests. Despite its natural native habitat having been severely logged in the past, it has avoided forests with secondary growth, shrub vegetation, and cultivated areas. Extensive research has shown only minimal migration between the fragmented populations.

== Conservation ==
The Taita Thrush, facing a precarious status with an estimated population of about 1,400 individuals, encountered a notable decline over recent years. Various population assessments suggest decreases, particularly in subpopulations across Mbololo, Ngangao, and Chawia. However, these figures come with uncertainties due to assumptions about habitat density and the use of estimation models.

== Threats ==
The Taita Thrush faces significant habitat challenges in the Taita Hills, where indigenous forests have been largely cleared for agriculture and non-native timber cultivation. Despite some segments being protected, ongoing forest loss remains a concern within the species' range. The quality of the remaining larger forest fragments is relatively good, but low connectivity between patches poses a problem for the thrush population, potentially leading to inbreeding issues.

An imbalanced sex ratio, particularly in the Chawia subpopulation, with only 10% of birds being female, raises concerns about long-term survival. This skewed sex ratio may result in a lower-than-expected reproductive rate, potentially affecting the thrush population's sustainability.
