= Danson Mwashako Mwakuwona =

Kenyan economist and politician

Hon. Danson Mwashako Mwakuwona

Member of Parliament for Wundanyi
- Incumbent
- Assumed office August 2017
- Preceded by: Thomas Ludindi Mwadeghu
- Constituency: Wundanyi Constituency

Personal details
- Party: Wiper Democratic Movement - Kenya
- Education: Bachelor of Arts (Economics and Business Studies)
- Alma mater: Kenyatta University

Danson Mwashako Mwakuwona is a Kenyan economist and politician. He is currently serving as the Member of Parliament for Wundanyi Constituency.

Mwashako was elected to the Kenyan Parliament in 2017 and was re-elected in 2022 for his second term. He was elected under Wiper Democratic Movement – Kenya party ticket.
