= Marylize Biubwa =

Kenyan LGBTQ activist

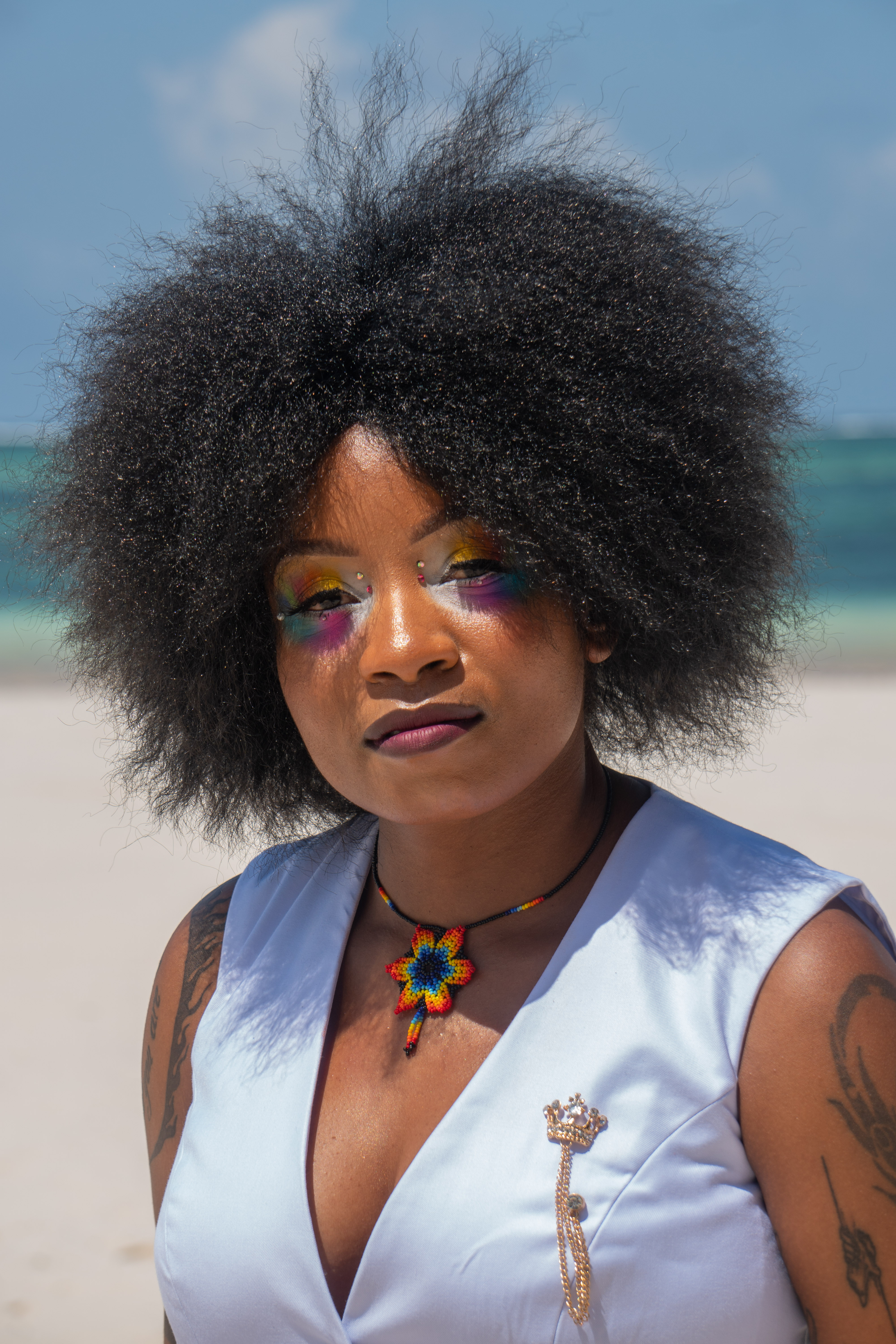
- Occupation: activist

Instagram information
- Page: biubwa_uncut
- Years active: 2020-present
- Followers: 5.3 thousand
- Last updated: 29 June 2026

Marylize Biubwa is a Kenyan intersectional feminist and activist. Biubwa's activism is based on social justice with emphasis on gender inequality, while their feminism is intersectional and directed towards human rights. They are black and a non-binary lesbian and use they/them pronouns.

== Early life ==
Biubwa grew up in Nairobi and Taita Taveta. They were one of six children, with three sisters and two brothers. Their mother was religious, and they were kicked out of their siblings' house in August 2018 after being outed by her. They have been diagnosed with social anxiety.

== Social activism ==
Biubwa became a full-time activist in 2015. They founded the Bi Kind Initiative in 2016, which mentors school-aged girls and organises drives to collect money and food for homeless women. They are a volunteer with ActionAid, the African Women's Development and Communication Network and Peace Ambassadors Kenya. They use Twitter and other social media platforms to debunk myths about female sexuality and the LGBT community. They run the research project Face on Project.
