= Wundanyi Constituency =

Kenyan electoral constituency

Wundanyi Constituency is an electoral constituency in Kenya. It is one of four constituencies in Taita-Taveta County. The constituency has four wards, all represented in the Taita-Taveta County Assembly. The constituency was established for the 1963 elections.

== Members of Parliament ==
Elections	MP	Party	Notes
1963	Dawson Mwanyumba	KANU	
1969	Juxton L. M. Shako	KANU	One-party system
1974	Dawson Mwanyumba	KANU	One-party system
1979	Mborio Mashengu Mwachofi	KANU	One-party system
1983	Mborio Mashengu Mwachofi	KANU	One-party system.
1988	Darius Msagha Mbela	KANU	One-party system
1992	Darius Msagha Mbela	KANU	
1997	Darius Msagha Mbela	DP	
2002	J. D. Mghanga Mwandawiro	Ford-People	
2007	Thomas Ludindi Mwadeghu	ODM	10th Parliament of Kenya
2013	Thomas Ludindi Mwadeghu	ODM	11th Parliament of Kenya
2017	Danson Mwashako Mwakuwona	WDP-K	12th Parliament of Kenya
2022	Danson Mwashako Mwakuwona	WDP-K	13th Parliament of Kenya

== Locations and wards ==
Locations
Location	Population*
Kishushe	4,585
Mbale	6,087
Mgange	10,793
Mwanda	4,219
Werugha	9,833
Wumingu	10.046
Wundanyi	16,128
Total	x
1999 census.

Wards
Ward	Registered Voters
Mwanda / Mghange	6,554
Werugha	4,751
Wumingu / Kishushe	6,279
Wundanyi / Mbale	10,152
Total	27,736
*September 2005.
