= Bura, Taita-Taveta County =

Bura
- Town
- Location in Kenya
- Coordinates: 03°27′11″S 38°18′44″E
- Country: Kenya
- County: Taita-Taveta County
- Elevation: 99 m (325 ft)
- Time zone: UTC+3 (EAT)

Bura is a town in Taita-Taveta County, Kenya.

== Location ==
The town is located in Mwatate sub-county, approximately 13 kilometres (8 mi), north-west of Mwatate, where the county headquarters are located. This is about 39 kilometres (24 mi) west of Voi, the largest town in the county. This is about 366 kilometres (227 mi) south-east of Nairobi, the capital and largest city in Kenya. Bura is located about 193 kilometres (120 mi) north-west of the post-city of Mombasa, on the Indian Ocean coast. The coordinates of Bura, Taita-Taveta County are: 03°27'11.0"S, 38°18'44.0"E (Latitude:-3.453050; Longitude:38.312222).

== Overview ==
Bura is situated in the Taita Hills. The geography is quite diverse, extending from the grassy fields, swamps and acacia forest of the plains, to dense patches of forest surrounded by semi-terraced farms on the steep hillsides. The climate of the area is strongly affected by its proximity to the ocean. The climate varies with the altitude. The lowlands are generally hot and dry, while the hills receive more rainfall and cooler temperatures.

The most extensively grown agricultural crops are corn and beans. Those who live in the dry lowland areas like Zare, Bura Station(Ng'ambwa) and Mwashuma grow millet, as it is drought resistant and does well in poor soil. Rice is grown in swampy areas like Barawa and Nyolo. On the cool hillsides like Bura Mission, Saghaighu, Tungulu, Mlambenyi and Dawida one finds banana groves. Those who are able to irrigate their land produce most of the vegetables grown in the area. These crops include tomato, cabbage and green pepper and they are marketed primarily in Mombasa. Other small-scale crops include cassava, sweet potato, citrus, pea, mango and sugar cane. Most farmers cannot afford farm machinery. They farm with hoes and hands.

== History ==
The people of Bura are predominantly of the Taita (Dawida) ethnic group, speaking the Dawida language as their mother tongue. The ancestors of the Bura Taita were said to have migrated from Lewa in Tanzania, in search of land for grazing and cultivation. They settled initially in the hills to grow crops, while maintaining plots of land in the lower region for others. Family members migrated seasonally to care for the farms and graze livestock. Game meat was plentiful and honey was harvested using traditional methods.

Several forces have largely destroyed the systems that the Bura people established to meet their needs while caring for their natural surroundings. In the late 1800s, Catholic missionaries came from the coast and confiscated 1000 acres of the best agricultural land. The Catholic Missionaries then built a Church which is currently over a century old but a new church has since been built to the right of the old one.

Many farmers moved away from their productive farms in search of land in the dry and bushy lowlands when this happened. Others resisted the Mission, and eventually it returned parts of the land that it had taken. The Mission was most generous with those who converted to Catholicism, urging them to settle on the best pieces of land surrounding the Mission, disregarding original settlers.

In the 1960s and 1970s, tourism began to emerge as Kenya's leading industry. Jomo Kenyatta, the president, generously offered a huge tract of land in this area to a European friend. This became the Taita Hills Wildlife Reserve and the Salt Lick Lodge. Hunting and killing of wild animals was criminalized, but little was done to protect the farmers from the animals. The result is that animals such as elephant and buffalo freely roam the lowlands destroying crops, uprooting fruit trees and endangering lives. The resulting insecurity keeps farmers from undertaking certain activities such as planting trees. It also means that large amounts of labor are required to guard crops, particularly at night.

The 1970s was a period of land demarcation. Private ownership of land became the rule and land was consolidated to settle families on individual tracts. Families could no longer depend on small tracts (shambas) in several areas as they had in the past. Consolidation means that a family must now depend on one piece of land to meet its needs. If that piece fails, the family faces hunger. Cooperation between family members has been affected; as nuclear families and their private land has replaced extended families managing larger and more diverse pieces of cornrnunal land. Conflicts have arisen as some acquired land in the most productive areas while others were consolidated on their least productive lands. Environmental degradation has increased as people are forced to cultivate on marginal land and destroy areas of ecological importance.

== Infrastructure ==
There are three health centers in the location including Sagaighu, Bura Station(Ng'ambwa) and the Mission. The first two are government operated, while the latter is a private clinic run by the church. There is a police base near the Mission, and another outpost at the Chiefs camp. The predominant religion is Catholicism. but the Anglican Church has a small following and plans are underway for the construction of an Anglican church. There are many schools, primary, secondary, and a teacher's college. Bura Primary school has 272 students from pre-school to class eight.

Bura Location has many schools and other institutions. There are ten primary schools, three high schools, a vocational center for the disabled, a polytechnic school and a private teachers' training college. There are plans underway to construct another secondary school in the lower region.

Bura is served by a station on the branch railway to Voi.

== See also ==
- Railway stations in Kenya
- Wundanyi

Bura Vocational Rehabilitation Centre in Taita Taveta County, is a government institution under the Ministry of Labour, State Department for Social Protection. The institution's mandate is to empower Persons with Disabilities through vocational skills training end impartation for Self-socio economic sustenance in Tailoring/Dress-Making/Garment Making/Shoe & Leather Technology, Hair Dressing & Beauty Therapy, Information Technology Skills, Home Craft and Electrical Installation/Wireman skills. Source:
