= Darius Msagha Mbela =

Kenyan politician

Darius Msagha Mbela was a Kenyan politician. He was a minister for agriculture and a former member of parliament for the Wundanyi Constituency.
