= Holili =

Holili Holili
- Location in Tanzania
- Coordinates: 03°22′49″S 37°38′28″E
- Country: Tanzania
- Region: Kilimanjaro Region
- District: Rombo District
- Elevation: 400 m (1,300 ft)
- Time zone: UTC+3 (East Africa Time )

Holili, is a town in Rombo District, Kilimanjaro Region, in northeastern Tanzania, at the border with Kenya.

== Location ==
The town is located approximately 41 kilometres (25 mi), by road, east of Moshi, the nearest large town on the Arusha–Holili–Taveta–Voi Road. The coordinates of the town are: 3°22'49.0"S, 37°38'28.0"E (Latitude:-3.380269; Longitude:37.641117).

== Overview ==
The town sits at the International border with Kenya, across from the town of Taveta, Kenya. The Holili/Taveta customs and immigration post is a One Stop Border Post.

== See also ==
- Taveta, Kenya
- Kilimanjaro Region
