= Wundanyi =

- Location in Kenya
- Coordinates: 03°23′54″S 38°21′37″E
- Country: Kenya
- County: Taita-Taveta County

Population (2015 Estimate)
  - Total: 62,340
- Time zone: UTC+3 (EAT)

Wundanyi is a town in the Taita-Taveta County of Kenya. Other urban centres in the county include Voi, Taveta and Mwatate.

== Location ==
Wundanyi is located approximately 17 kilometres (11 mi) north of Mwatate, the county headquarters. It is about 40 kilometres (25 mi) west of Voi, the largest town in the county. Wundanyi is about 195 kilometres (121 mi) north-west of the port of Mombasa, the nearest large city, and about 368 kilometres (229 mi) south-east of Nairobi, the capital and largest city of Kenya. The coordinates of Wundanyi are 03°23'54.0"S. 38°21'37.9"E (Latitude: −3.398329; Longitude: 38.360526).

== Overview ==
The town is a popular base for hiking, while local attractions include the Ngangao Forest, known for its butterflies, Wesu Rock and the Cave of Skulls. Shomoto Hill, across the valley from Wundanyi was the formal place of execution for the Taita. Wundanyi is the centre of an agricultural area and the surrounding slopes are highly terraced.

== Population ==
In 2011, the population of Taita-Taveta County was quoted at 284,657. As of May 2015, the population of Wundayi town was estimated at 21.9 percent of the county population, about 62,340 people.

== See also ==
- Bura, Taita-Taveta County
- Wesu District Hospital
