= Johnes Mwaruma =

Kenyan politician

Johnes Mwashushe Mwaruma

Senator of Taita Taveta County
- Incumbent
- Assumed office 2015
- President: Uhuru Kenyatta

Personal details
- Party: Orange Democratic Movement
- Occupation: Politician

Johnes Mwashushe Mwaruma is a Kenyan politician. He is currently the senator of Taita Taveta County. He is a member of Orange Democratic Movement. He is a member of the Senate Committee on Education, the Committee on Lands, Environment and Natural Resources, and the County Public Accounts Committee
