= Andrew Mwadime =

Kenyan politician and governor of Taita Taveta County

Andrew Mwadime is a Kenyan politician and current governor of Taita Taveta County. He was a member of Kenyan National assembly before being elected governor in August 2022 as an independent candidate following his resignation from Communist Party of Kenya.

== Political career ==
Mwadime was elected to the 11th parliament for Mwatate Constituency in Taita Taveta County on the ticket of Orange Democratic Movement (ODM) in 2013. He defeated the incumbent MP Calist Andrew Mwatela. Mwadime was reelected in 2017 to the 12th parliament. During his time in the parliament, he served on several committees including Public Accounts, Pension (11th parliament), Parliamentary Powers and Privileges and Departmental Committee on Trade, Industry and Cooperatives in the 12th parliament. He was elected governor of Taita Taveta County as an independent candidate in August 2022. He polled 49,901 vote to defeat incumbent governor Granton Samboja who scored 23,703 votes.
