= Thomas Ludindi Mwadeghu =

Kenyan politician

Thomas Ludindi Mwadeghu is a Kenyan politician. He belongs to the Orange Democratic Movement and was elected to represent the Wundanyi Constituency in the National Assembly of Kenya since the Kenyan parliamentary election in 2007.
