= Kenya Petroleum Refineries Limited =

Kenyan oil refinery

- Formerly: East African Oil Refineries Limited
- Company type: Public
- Industry: Oil Refinery
- Founded: 1960
- Headquarters: Mombasa, Kenya
- Owner: Government of Kenya (100%)

Kenya Petroleum Refineries Limited (KPRL) is a Kenyan oil refinery based in Mombasa. Kenya Petroleum Refineries Limited is currently managed by the government of Kenya. It was founded in 1960 by the government of Kenya with Shell and the British Petroleum Co. BP. As of June 2016, 100 percent of the shares are owned by the government of Kenya.

== History ==
KPRL was founded in 1960. It was originally founded by Shell and BP to distribute and supply the East Africa with oil products. Kenya Petroleum Refineries Limited was established as East African Oil Refineries Limited. The first refinery building with distillation, hydro-treating, catalytic reforming and bitumen production units was commissioned in 1963. In 1974 another refinery was launched. In 1971 the Kenyan government decided to buy in 50% of the shares from Royal Dutch Shell. In 1983, the name of the company was changed to Kenya Petroleum Refineries Limited.

In July 2009, Essar Energy acquired 50 percent stake in KPRL for $7 million from Chevron, BP and Royal Dutch Shell.

Crude oil refining operations stopped in September 2013.

In 2016, Essar Energy sold its share of KPRL to the government of Kenya.

On June 9, 2018, KPRL plant received the first batch of the initial Early Oil Pilot Scheme (EOPS) from Turkana oil fields.

== Board members ==
The company is managed by Board of Directors and a management team. The board of directors is made up of 6 members who represent the Kenya government who is the sole owner of the company.

== Services ==
- Product Handling & Hospitality
  - Liquid Petroleum Gas (LPG)
  - Premium Petrol
  - Dual Purpose Kerosene
  - Automotive Gasoil
  - Fuel Oilservices
- Laboratory Services: certify/verify that oil product(s) meet stipulated standards
- Fuel Loading Facilities
