= Naomi Shaban =

Kenyan politician

Naomi Namsi Shaban

Member of Parliament for Taveta Constituency
- In office 2002–2022

Minister of State for Special Programmes
- In office 2008–2010
- President: Mwai Kibaki

Minister for Gender and Children Affairs
- In office 2010–2013
- President: Mwai Kibaki

Deputy Leader of Majority Party, Parliament of Kenya

Kenya Branch Representative – Commonwealth Parliamentary Association
- In office 2003–2007

Personal details
- Born: Taveta, Kenya
- Party: Kenya African National Union (KANU) (Until 2012); The National Alliance (TNA) (2012–2016); Jubilee Party (2016–Present)
- Children: 3
- Occupation: Politician
- Committees: Parliamentary Committee on Appointments; House Business Committee; Health Committee

Naomi Namsi Shaban is a Kenyan politician from the border town of Taveta. Born of Taveta descent, she became the first woman elected to represent the Taveta Constituency in Parliament in 2002 through a Kenya African National Union (KANU) ticket. She defended the seat in 2007 election through KANU and won. Later she joined the National Alliance Party (TNA) and was re-elected to represent Taveta Constituency in the National Assembly of Kenya in 2013. In 2017 she was re-elected for a record fourth term in a controversial manner as her main opponent Morris Mutiso cried foul play and sought for the results to be annulled on grounds of irregularities and illegalities.

In 2008 To 2010: she was appointed Minister of State for Special Programmes, Kenya; later in a cabinet reshuffle in August 2010, she became Minister for Gender and Children Affairs.

Although she has managed to keep her children's fathers and marriages a mystery, She is a mother to three.

She is the current Deputy Leader of Majority Party in the Parliament of Kenya, a member of the Parliamentary Committee on Appointments, House Business Committee and Health Committee. 2003 – 2007: Kenya Branch Representative – Commonwealth Parliamentary Association
