= Jacinta Mwatela =

Kenyan politician and banker

Jacinta Wanjala Mwatela is a Kenyan politician and banker who was the former acting governor of the Central Bank of Kenya. She was also the first woman to be deputy governor of CBK

== Early life and education ==
Jacinta Wanjala Mwatela was born in Njawuli village in Mghange, Wundanyi sub county, Taita Taveta County. She attended Njawuli Primary School in Mghange, Taita Taveta County before joining Bura Girls High School for her O levels. She then joined Loreto Limuru High School for her form Five and Six. She studied a bachelor's degree in commerce at the University of Nairobi. She joined politics in 2013 and vied for the position of Governor Taita Taveta County, but lost.

== Career ==
She worked with the Central Bank of Kenya in various departments since December 1, 1977 when she joined as a Graduate Trainee. On May 12, 2005, she was appointed the Deputy Governor of the Central Bank of Kenya. In March 2006, she was the Acting Governor of the Central Bank of Kenya for one year. She is the first woman to serve as a deputy governor and also acting governor. In September 2008, she declined an appointment to serve as Permanent Secretary in the Ministry of Northern Kenya Development and Arid Areas.

== Personal life ==
She is married to Calist Mwatela.
