= Voi Sisal Estate =

Voi Sisal Estate is located near the township of Voi in the Taita-Taveta County of Kenya. It specializes mainly in production of sisal fibre.

There are two semi autobiographical books written about the life on the estate. They are On A Plantation in Kenya (later re-titled Red Soils of Tsavo) written by M G. Visram and its sequel Beyond The Baobab Tree.
