= Teita Sisal Estate =

Estate in Kenya

Coordinates: 3°32′S 38°24′E

The Teita Sisal Estate is one of the largest sisal estates in the world, and the largest in East Africa. It is located in Kenya's Taita-Taveta County, in the former Coast Province, near the town of Mwatate. The company is active in growing sisal and in manufacturing sisal goods such as rope, sacks and baling twine, at its manufacturing facility in Nairobi.
