= Mwatate =

- Location within Kenya
- Coordinates: 03°30′17″S 38°22′40″E
- Country: Kenya
- County: Taita-Taveta County
- Elevation: 844 m (2,769 ft)

Population (2015 Estimate)
  - Urban: 5,551
- Time zone: UTC+3 (EAT)

Mwatate is a town in Taita-Taveta County, Kenya. It is the county's capital, although it is the fourth-largest town in the county. Other urban centers in Taita-Taveta County include Voi, Wundanyi and Taveta.

== Location ==
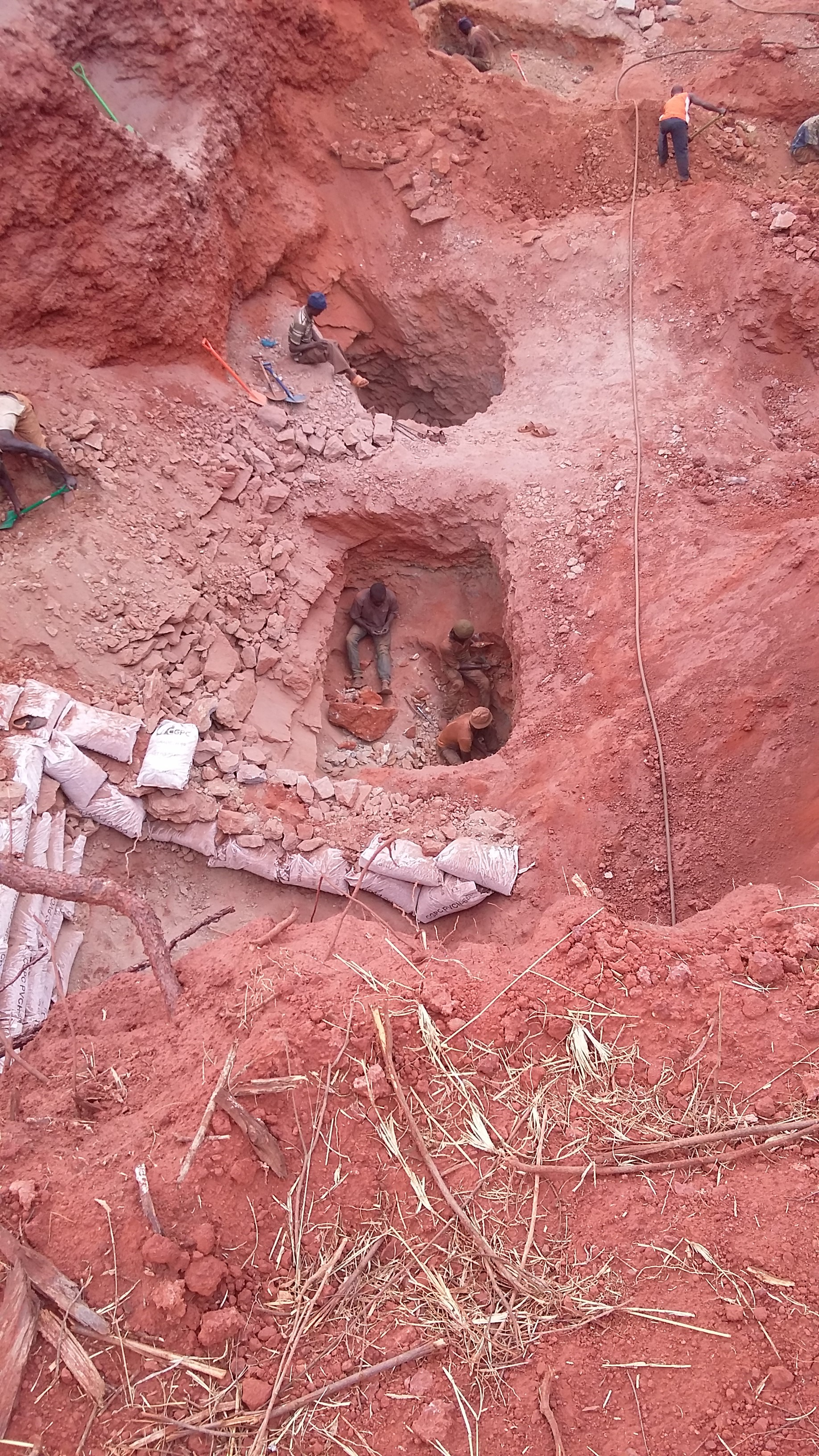
Men working at gemstone mining site in Mwatate

Mwatate lies about 26 kilometres (16 mi) south-west of Voi, the largest town in the county. This is approximately 181 kilometres (112 mi) north-west of the port city of Mombasa, the nearest large city. Mwatate is located about 354 kilometres (220 mi) south-east of Nairobi, the capital and largest city in Kenya. The coordinates of Mwatate are: 03°30'17.0"S, 38°22'40.0"E (Latitude:-3.504720; Longitude:38.377782).

== Overview ==
Mwatate held the headquarters of the whole district during the British colonial rule from 1900 to 1912, when the headquarters moved to Voi. Teita Sisal Estate, one of the largest sisal estates in the world, is also located near the town of Mwatate. The town lies at an average elevation of 844 metres (2,769 ft), above sea level.

== Population ==
In 2011, the population of Taita-Taveta County was quoted at 284,657. As of May 2015, the population of Mwatate town was estimated at 1.95 percent of the county population, about 5,551 people. The population of the town has increased in recent years partly because of people migrating to town to establish businesses and others are attracted by the lucrative business of buying and selling the precious stone called Tsavorite, that is found around the area.
