= Taita Hills Wildlife Sanctuary =

Wildlife sanctuary in Kenya

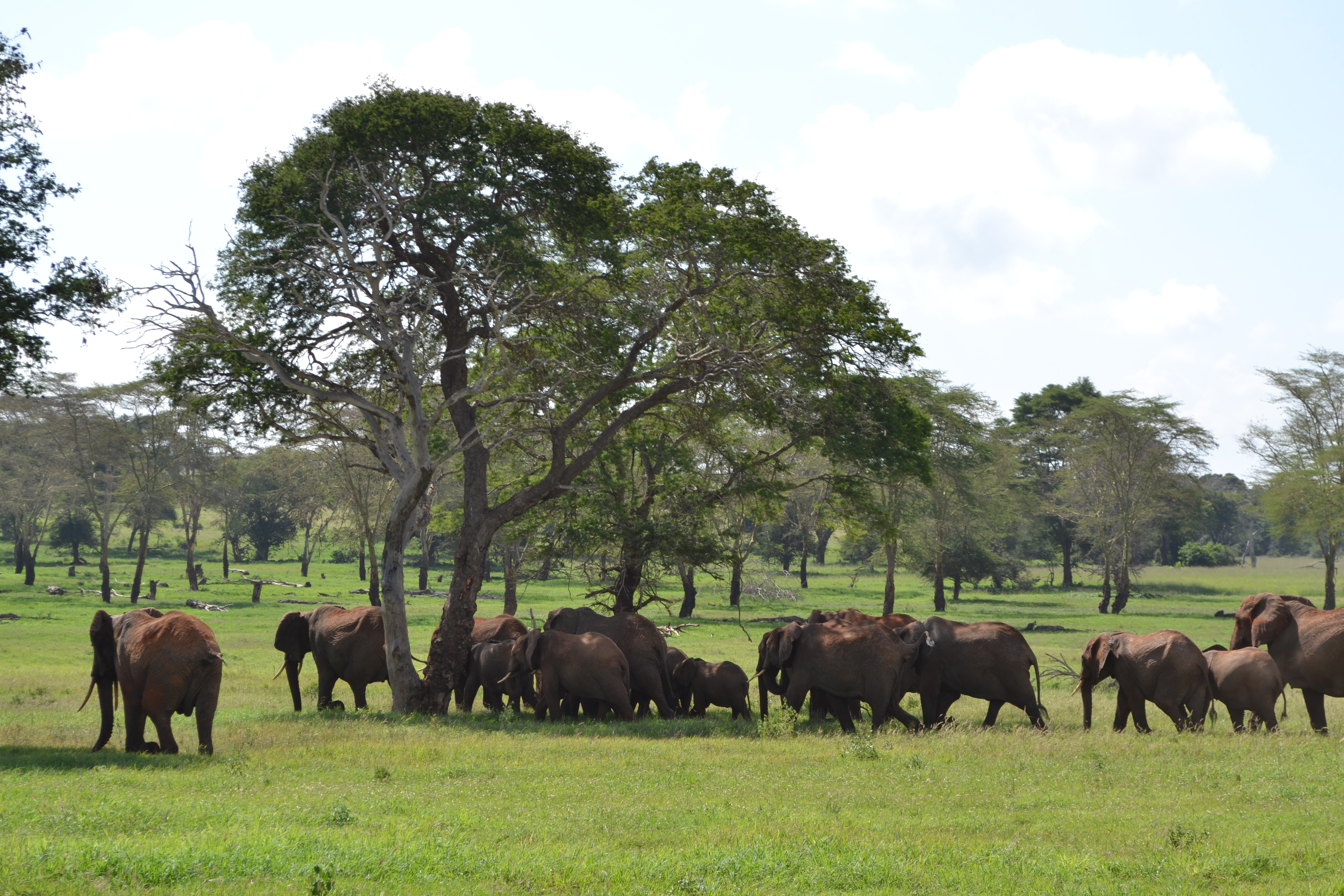
African elephants at Taita Hills

Taita Hills Wildlife Sanctuary is a privately owned wildlife sanctuary in Kenya established in 1972 by Hilton International. It is located in Taita-Taveta County approximately 200 km (120 mi) from Mombasa and 370 km (230 mi) south of Nairobi. The sanctuary covers an area of 110 km^{2} (42 sq mi), and is adjacent to Tsavo West National Park and the LUMO Community Wildlife Sanctuary.

The sanctuary hosts a diverse range of animals, including Cape buffalo, African bush elephant, leopard, lion, cheetah, Masai giraffe, plains zebra, Coke's hartebeest, impala, waterbuck, Thomson's gazelle, lesser kudu, Kirk's dik-dik, spotted hyena, and other smaller animals, as well as a diversity of birds and plantlife. The sanctuary claims to have recorded over 50 species of large mammal, as well as over 300 species of birds within the park.
