= Taita Hills =

Mountain range in Kenya

Coordinates: 3°25′S 38°20′E

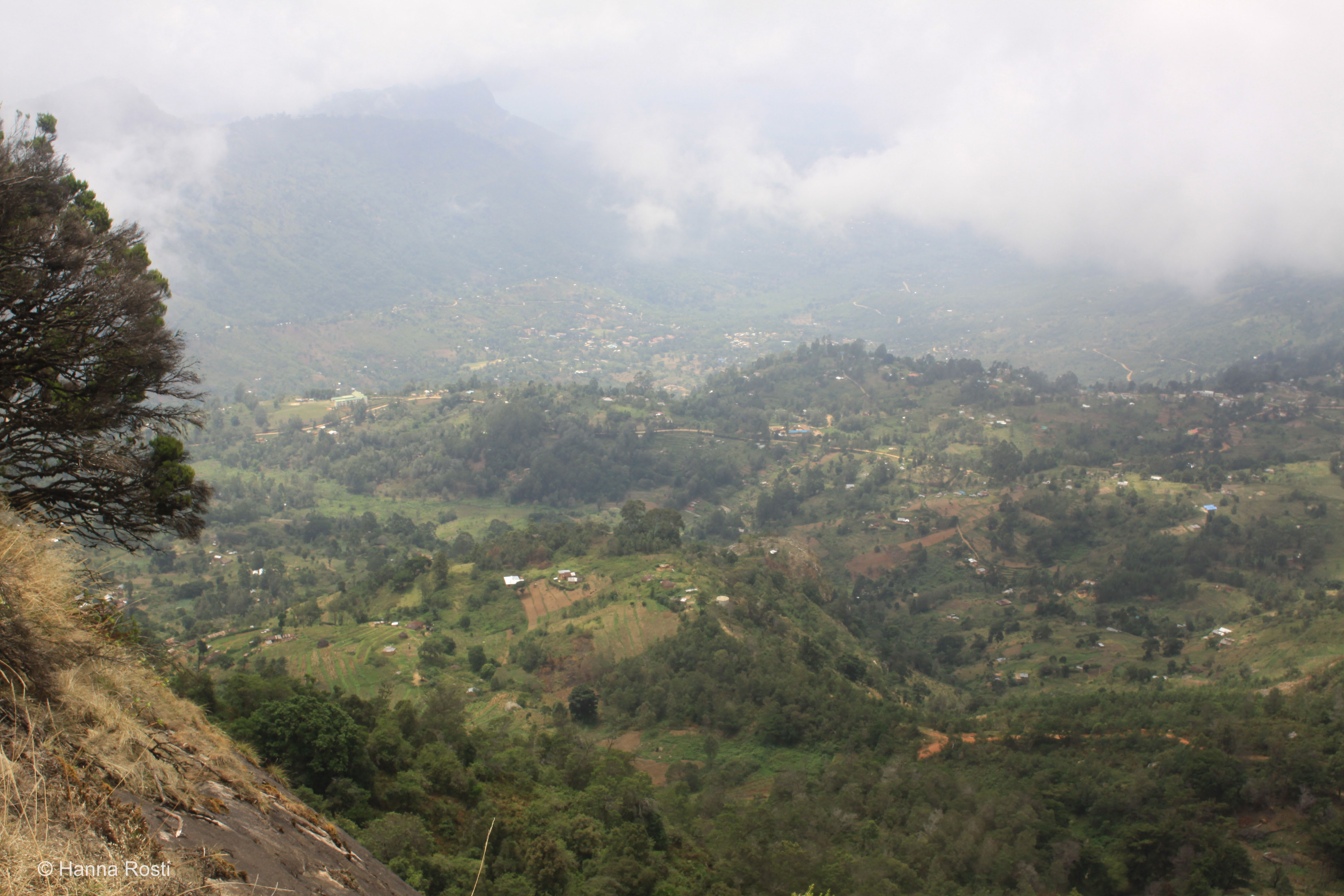
Taita Hills

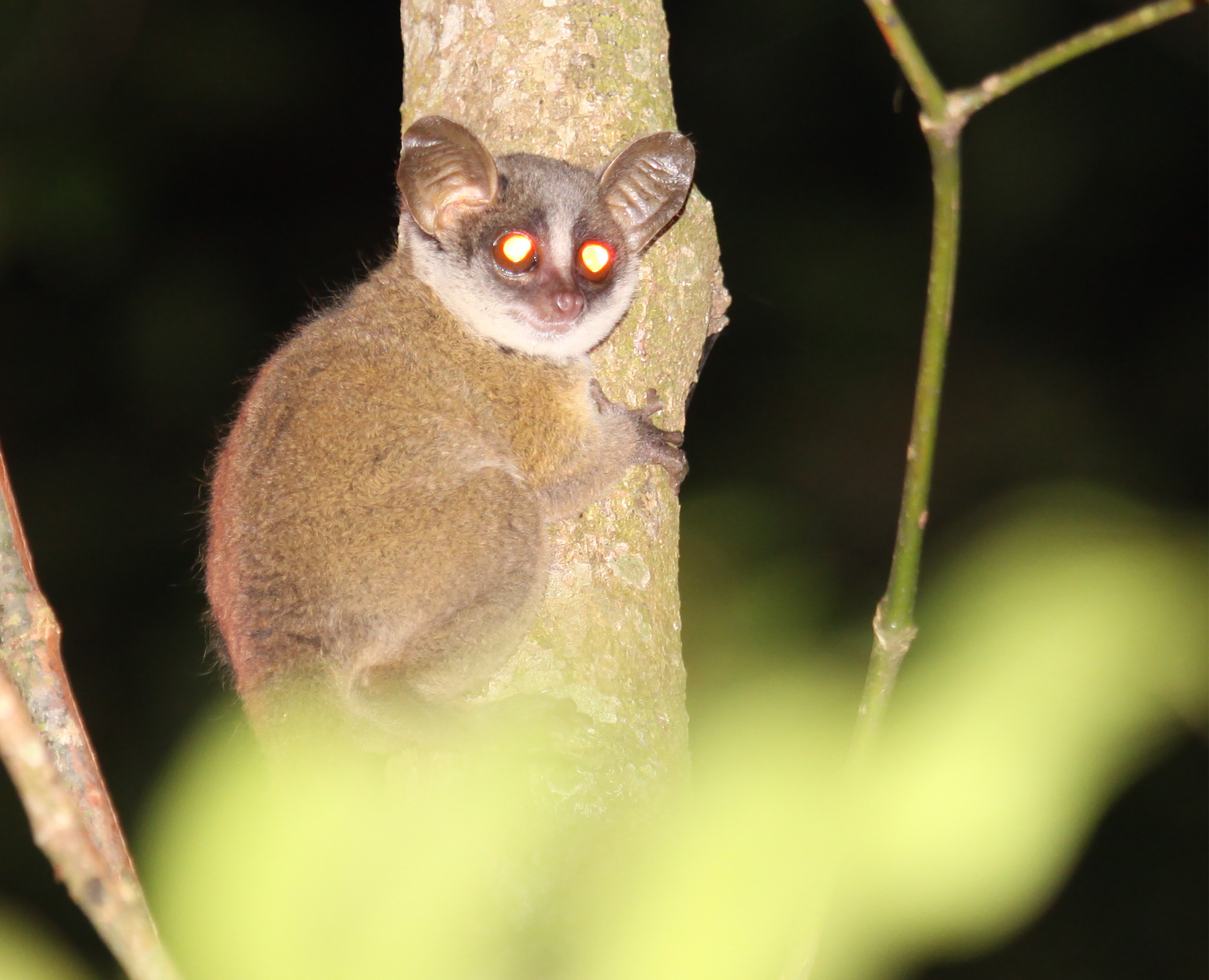

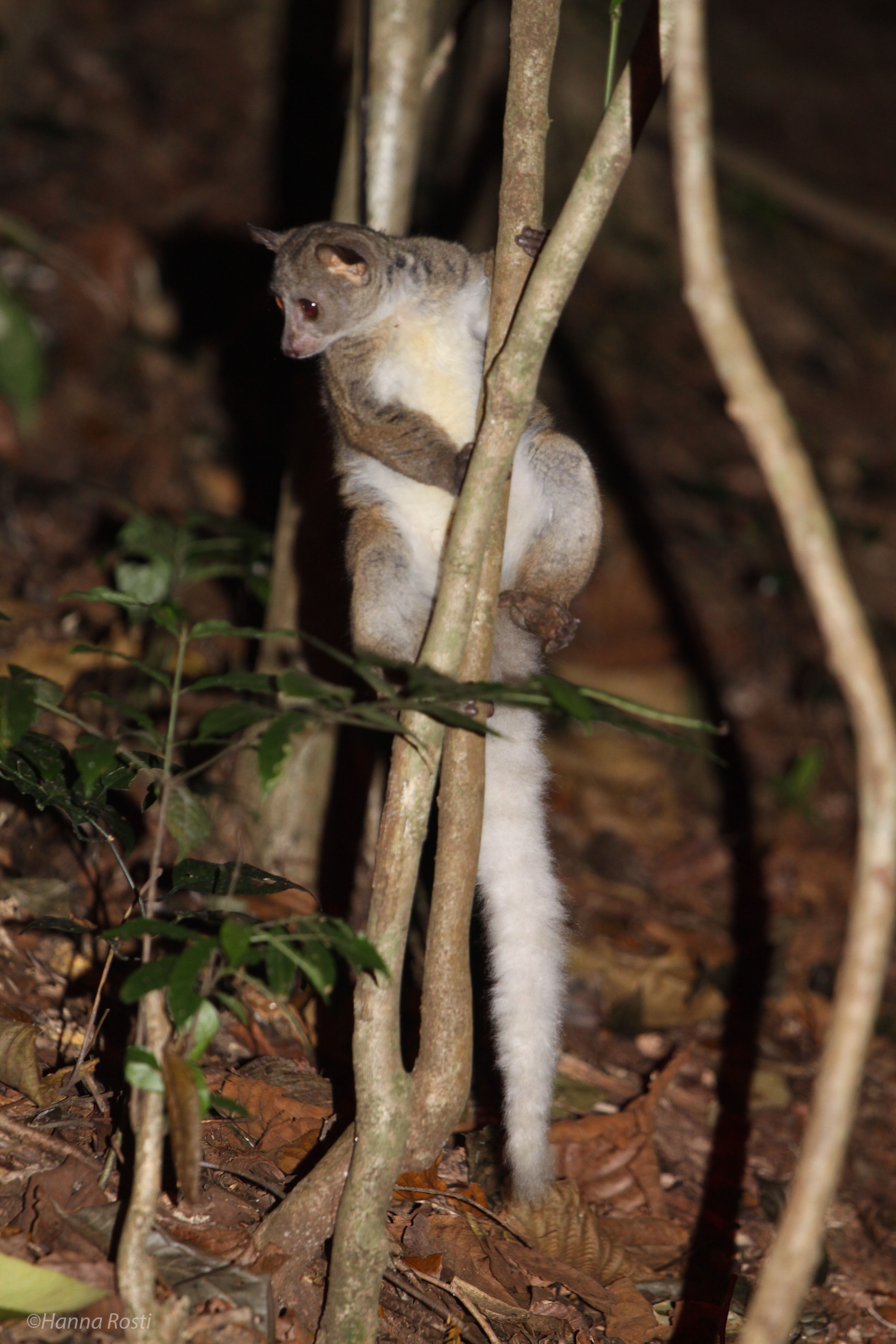

The Taita Hills, sometimes also spelled Teita Hills, are a mountain range located in the Taita-Taveta County in south-eastern Kenya. The hills consist of three massifs: Dawida, Sagalla in the southern side of Voi township and Kasigau in the south near the border of Tanzania. The Dawida massif is the largest and tallest of the three, with an altitude of 2,228 metres (7,310 ft) above sea level at its highest peak, Vuria. Dawida has three other main peaks: Iyale, Wesu, and Susu.

== Geology ==
The Taita Hills, with others in the Eastern Arc Mountains, were formed more than one hundred million years ago. About thirty million years ago, the area was covered by extensive rainforest. During a cooler and drier period some ten million years ago, the lowland forests were converted to savanna, leaving the mountain ranges as "islands" where the tropical forests continued to flourish. The isolation of each mountain range has led to a great deal of endemism, and a very diverse flora and fauna. Some of the other mountain ranges are well-forested, but the Taita Hills retain just 6 km^{2} (2.3 mi^{2}) of forest. The Taita Hills rise steeply from the Tsavo West National Park.

== Ecology ==
The hills are known for their moist forests with a unique fauna and flora. More than 20 endemic species of African violets (e.g., Streptocarpus teitensis) occur exclusively in that region. Known endemic bird species are the Taita thrush (Turdus helleri) and the Taita apalis (Apalis fuscigularis). The Taita falcon (Falco fasciinucha) and the Taita fiscal (Lanius dorsalis) were first discovered at the hills but occur elsewhere, too. An amphibian in the genus Boulengerula occurs only in the Taita Hills. The Sagala caecilian (Boulengerula niedeni) is an endangered worm-like amphibian that lives in the Taita Hills.

The native Taita people are living at the edge of the forests and farming the soil, which is very productive. Fifty percent of indigenous forests were replaced by exotic tree plantations between 1955 and 2004. The region was severely logged in the past and the remaining indigenous forest is now part of a nature reserve, the Taita Hills Wildlife Sanctuary. On the plains and foothills surrounding the hills, the land is predominantly used for cropping and grazing. The largest fragments of forest are located in the most inaccessible areas. The land is being degraded by deforestation, the lowering of the water table, and soil erosion. The annual rainfall varies from 500 mm (20 in) in the lowlands to more than three times this amount in the mountain zone. This area experiences two rainy seasons: March to May or June, and October to December, but the precipitation is very variable. Remaining forests are amazingly abundant with all forms of life Taita Hills are home to Small-Eared Greater Galago (Otolemur garnettii) and rare (but locally abundant) tree hyrax (Dendrohyrax sp.). Dwarf galago (Paragalago cocos) are still also found in the Taita Hills, although its numbers are dangerously low.
