= Taveta, Kenya =

Taveta
- Location within Kenya
- Coordinates: 03°23′44″S 37°40′34″E
- Country: Kenya
- County: Taita-Taveta County
- Elevation: 1,000 m (3,300 ft)

Population (2019)
  - Total: 22,018
- Time zone: UTC+3 (EAT)

Taveta is a town in the Taita-Taveta County, Kenya.

== Location ==
Taveta town is wedged into a projection of Kenyan territory bordered on the north and west by Tanzania.

The town lies on the border with Tanzania, directly across from the town of Holili. Approximately 111 kilometres (69 mi), by road, west of Voi, the nearest large town, on the Arusha–Holili–Taveta–Voi Road. Taveta is approximately 305 kilometres (190 mi), by road southeast of Nairobi. The coordinates of the town are:3°23'44.0"S, 37°40'34.0"E (Latitude:-3.395565; Longitude:37.676113). In addition to Mount Kilimanjaro, Taveta also enjoys proximity to Lake Chala, a volcanic freshwater lake of extraordinary depth.

== Etymology ==
According to Claud Hollis (1901), the name "Taveta" originates from the local people known as the Watuweta or Watubheta, who have lived in the area since the 16th century. Taveta, historically, was divided into two,Malaboru(upper Taveta) and Malakaolu (Lower Taveta).These communities primarily settled along the banks of the River Lumi and in the Taveta Forest, which once extended across regions such as Mboghoni, Seriangabo (Kititoni), Msengoni, Njoro, Msheghesheni, Mkuyuni, and Miereni. The forest reached the swamps near Lake Jipe and the area surrounding Kitobo Forest.

Hollis writes that the natives pronounced the name as "Tuweta", which in the local dialect means "passing in the plain". This reflects the geographical nature of Taveta, which lies in a flat plain at the foot of Mount Kilimanjaro. In the Kitubheta dialect, "passing by" is said as "Kubhetia", from which the words "Tubheta" or "Tuweta" derive. The British, unable to pronounce the local term correctly, recorded the name as "Taveta".

== First World War ==
In 1914, Taveta was the scene of the first military action in East Africa between forces of the British and German empires. On 15 August, a German force of about 300 soldiers, led by Captain Tom von Prince, advanced across the border and seized the town of Taveta. The objective was both to strengthen the defence of German East Africa and to provide a base for attacks into British territory, especially on the Uganda Railway.

Corporal Murimu Mwiti, leading the small group of police that were defending Taveta, stood his ground and was killed by the advancing German forces. A German officer, Friedrich Broeker, was also shot before the British force retreated. Taveta remained in German hands until it was recaptured by the British in March 1916.

== Overview ==
Taveta thrives as a point of commerce between Kenya and Tanzania, with a twice-weekly open-air market especially large for a town of its size. The market is fueled in part by Taveta's rail connection through Voi with the Mombasa-Nairobi-Kampala line, built during the era of British Kenya. Large numbers of people walk across the border from Tanzania to buy and sell wares in Taveta; smuggled goods such as Tanzanian rubies and coffee are occasionally available there.

Taveta Town is a fast-growing town. The Town Council of Taveta has acquired a 20 square kilometres (4,900 acres) former sisal plantation for town expansion. All government border offices are located some 5 kilometres (3 mi) west of the central business district of the town, towards the border with Tanzania. The Holili/Taveta customs and immigration post is a One Stop Border Post.

The current (2024) Member of Parliament for Taveta Constituency, which is largely the district and by extension the town, is Hon. John Okano Bwire. She is a third term Member of Parliament.

At one time, Taveta has had several Members of Parliament from different tribes, namely Mwacharo Kubo (Taita), Norman Lukindo (Kamba), Jackson Mwalulu (Kamba), Alex Dingiria, Othinel Mnene, Naomi Shaaban (all Taveta), and Basil Criticos, a Kenyan of Greek origin.

== Population ==
As of 2019, the urban center had a population of 22,018. The main ethnicities in Taveta are the Taveta and Kamba tribes.

== See also ==
- Railway stations in Kenya
- Railway stations in Tanzania
