= Voi =

Town in Taita–Taveta County, Kenya

Voi Ore (Native Sagallas)
- Town
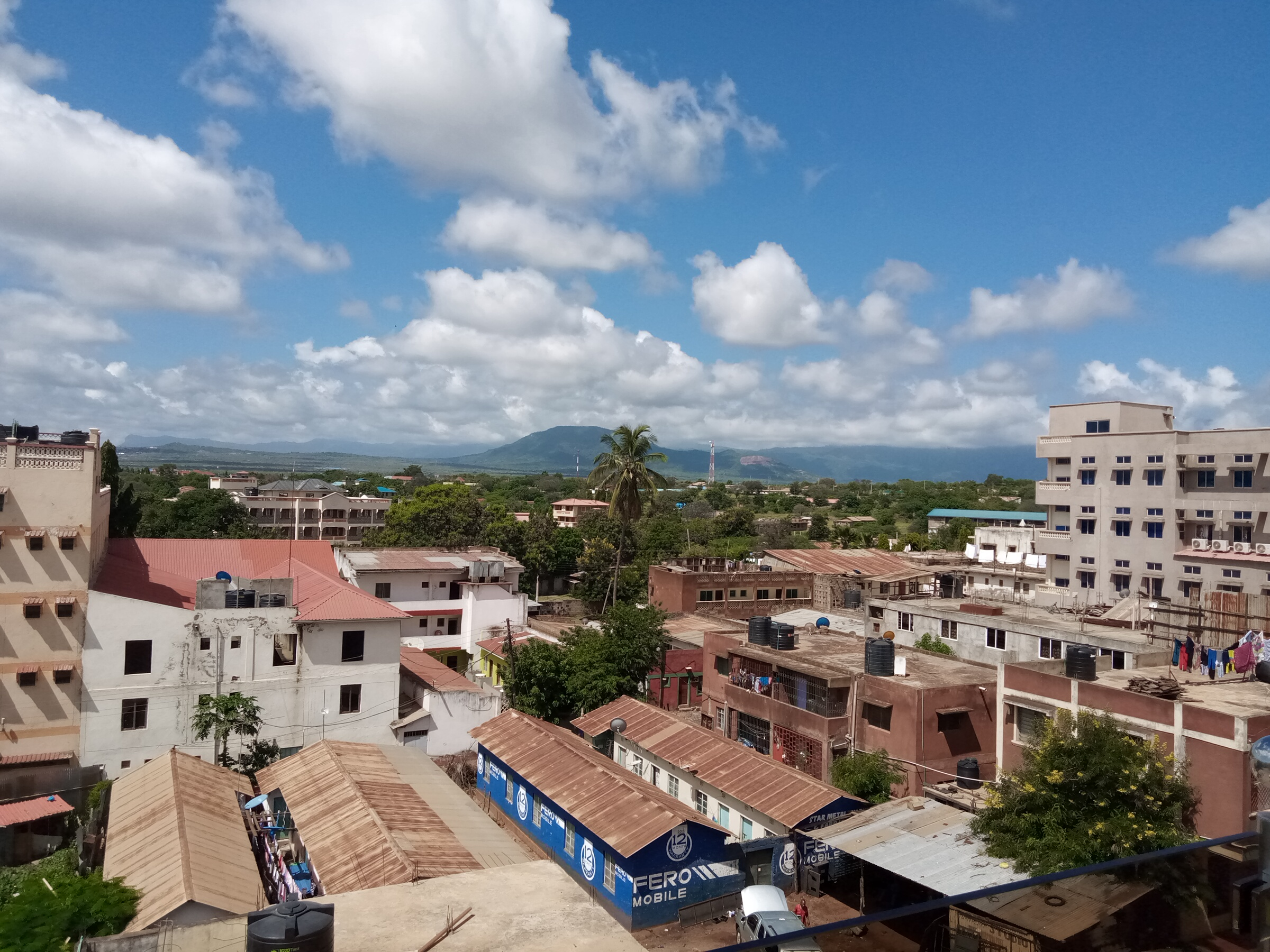
- Voi town centre.

- Location in Kenya
- Coordinates: 03°23′26″S 38°34′37″E
- Country: Kenya
- County: Taita-Taveta County
- Location: Voi Location
- Town: 1932
- Elevation: 580 m (1,900 ft)

Population (2009)
  - Town: 45,483
  - Urban: 17,152
  - Rural: 28,331
- Time zone: UTC+3 (EAT)

Voi is the largest town in Taita-Taveta County, Kenya, in the former Coast Province. It is located at the western edge of Taru Desert, south and west of Tsavo East National Park, with the Sagala Hills to the south.

== Economy ==
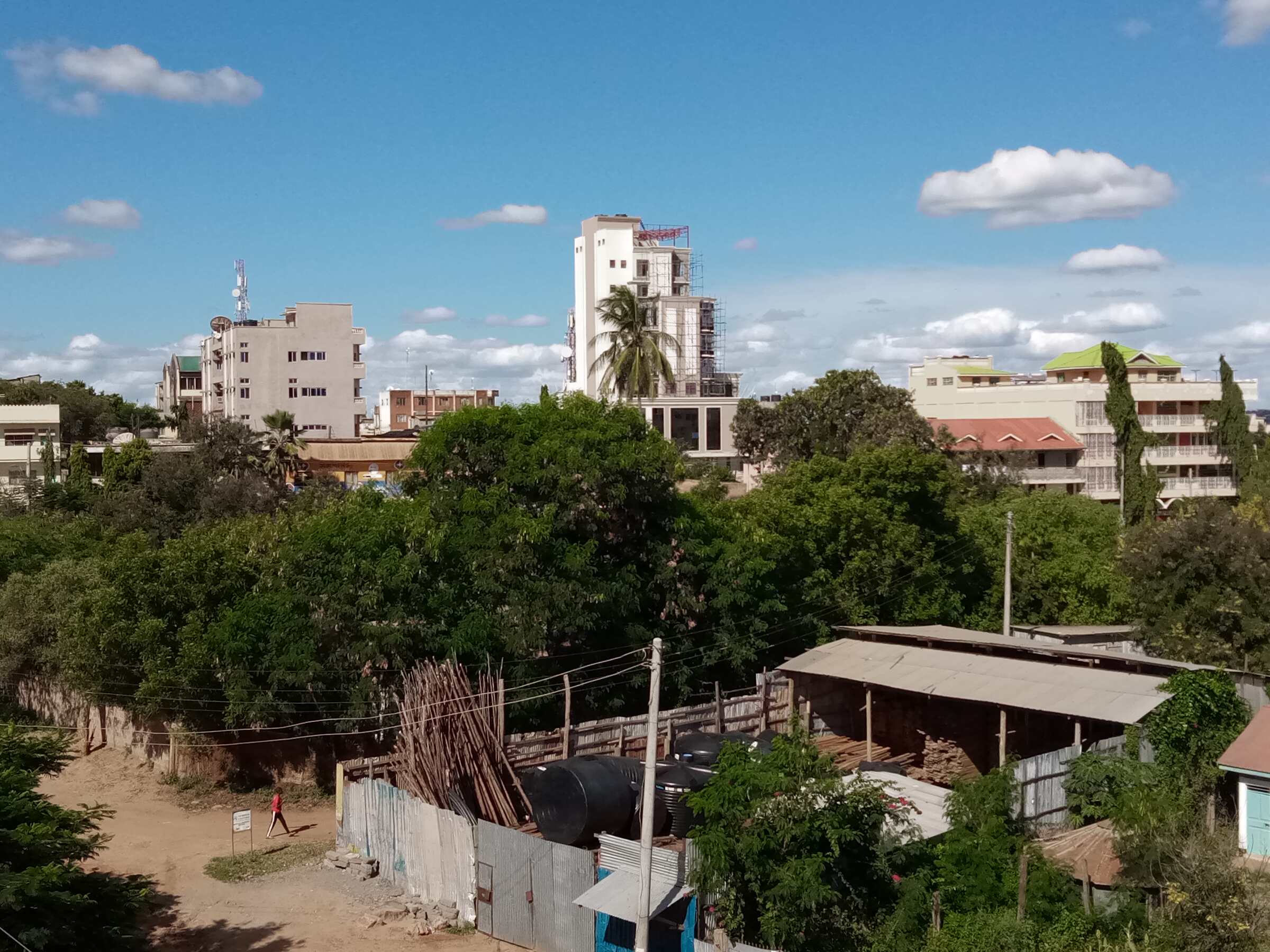
The Voi skyline is changing rapidly, a sign of investor confidence in the future of the town.

Voi serves as a marketplace for agricultural and meat products from Taita Hills as well as other surrounding areas.

The town centre consists mainly of general stores, shops, markets, kiosks and hotels. Most lodges that service tourists for the national parks are located in the suburbs at the edge of town. The Voi Sisal Estates are located to the west of the town.

== History ==
A settlement at Voi (Known as Ore by Sagallas (natives of the Town) was established in 1897, in the form of a camp that served as a resting place on the Kenya-Uganda Railway, which was then under construction.

Most of the settlement's early residents were Indians working on the railway. At that time, other human habitation in the area was limited, due to a fear of wild animals, especially lions. The native people of the area were living in the hills.

During the 20th century, people gradually moved to Voi to work on the railway, and on the nearby sisal estates. The influx included native people from Sagalla, mostly farmers who started tilling the land along the River Voi (better known to them as mgogoni), and Indians, who were relocating for business purposes.

Township status with an area of about 16.27 square kilometres (6.28 sq mi) was not granted until 1932. The town has long since outgrown the original grant; as of 2022, it had a land area of 55.31 km^{2} (21.36 sq mi), and the highest population growth rate among the towns in the county.

== Climate ==
Voi has a hot semi-arid climate (Köppen climate classification BSh).

Climate data for Voi
Month	Jan	Feb	Mar	Apr	May	Jun	Jul	Aug	Sep	Oct	Nov	Dec	Year
Mean daily maximum °C (°F)	31.6 (88.9)	32.9 (91.2)	33.3 (91.9)	31.8 (89.2)	29.9 (85.8)	29.0 (84.2)	28.1 (82.6)	28.0 (82.4)	29.2 (84.6)	31.1 (88.0)	31.4 (88.5)	30.6 (87.1)	30.6 (87.1)
Mean daily minimum °C (°F)	20.1 (68.2)	20.2 (68.4)	20.8 (69.4)	20.4 (68.7)	20.0 (68.0)	18.3 (64.9)	17.5 (63.5)	17.2 (63.0)	17.6 (63.7)	18.9 (66.0)	20.1 (68.2)	20.4 (68.7)	19.3 (66.7)
Average precipitation mm (inches)	34 (1.3)	29 (1.1)	79 (3.1)	100 (3.9)	30 (1.2)	6 (0.2)	3 (0.1)	8 (0.3)	15 (0.6)	26 (1.0)	106 (4.2)	119 (4.7)	555 (21.9)
Average precipitation days	5	3	8	7	5	2	1	2	3	4	10	8	58
Source: World Meteorological Organization

== Transport ==
=== Train ===
Voi has two railway stations. The first older station lies on the Kenya-Uganda Railway which was built by the British between 1895 and 1901 linking the port of Mombasa with Uganda. This station also forms the junction between the main line and a smaller, now abandoned line to Taveta on the Tanzania border. The second, newer, railway station serves the Mombasa–Nairobi Standard Gauge Railway. Passenger trains on the newer railway line have four daily stopovers in Voi (two either way). Passenger services on the old, British-built railway ceased in May 2017 but freight trains continue running on the line.

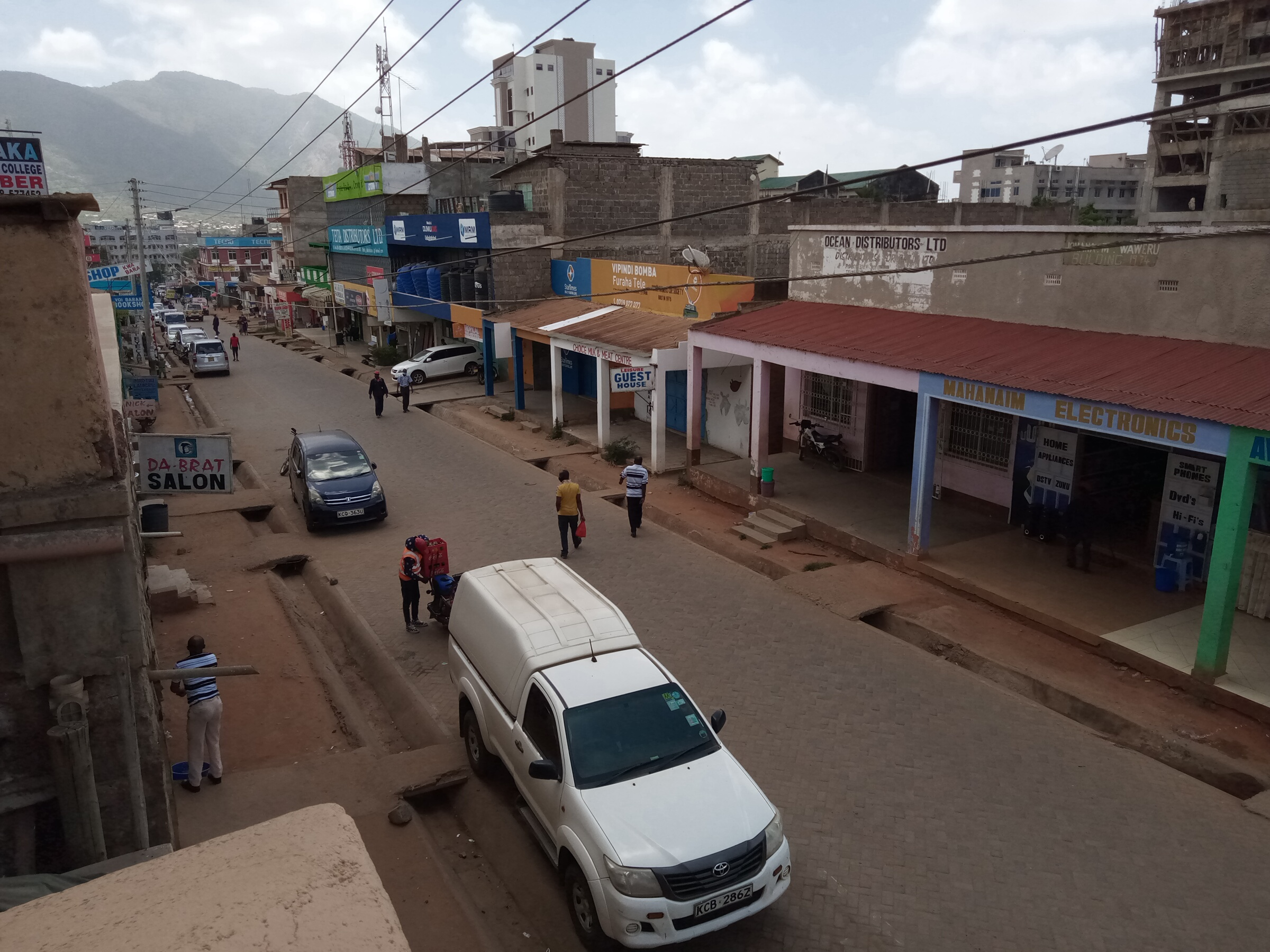
View of one of the streets in the centre of Voi town.

=== Taxi ===
Taxis are available in the town centre with fares negotiated rather than regulated. They service various routes mainly to residential estates such as Mwakingali, Ikanga, Sikujua, Mabomani, Birikani, Sofia, Kaloleni, Tanzania, Msinga, Kariakoo, Msambweni and Mazeras.

=== Matatu ===
Matatus (Minibus/Sharetaxis) operate between the town centre and surrounding areas. There are also matatus traveling to Mombasa, Taita Hills, Sagala Hills, Wundanyi, Taveta, Kasighau, Mbololo and other places. Their routes are regulated by SACCOs such as TATAMA, 2TS and Wumeri.

=== Bus ===
Several bus companies, including Coast bus, Simba coach, dreamliner Tahmeed and Mash offer day and night services to various parts of Kenya. Voi has a bus park for ticket purchases.

=== Air ===
The Ikanga Air Strip is nearby and is under construction by the Kenya Airports Authority.

=== Other forms of transport ===
Other forms of transport include three-wheeler auto rickshaws (tuk tuks) and motorcycle taxis (boda boda) which operate 24/7 and are very cheap.

== Electoral Wards ==
Voi Municipality is divided into six wards: Marungu, Sagalla, Mbololo, Kaloleni, Ngolia, and Kasigau.

Each ward elects one Member of the County Assembly (MCA) who represents them in the County Assembly for 5-year term.

== Internet services ==
Internet services are available through several internet cafes in town and there is 4G mobile phone coverage in Voi and its surroundings.

== In fiction ==
Voi features as a setting for two levels of the first-person shooter Xbox 360 console game Halo 3. Halo 3 takes place late in the year 2552, wherein Voi is depicted as formerly having been a heavily industrialized, sprawling city — vastly different from the real and present Voi. According to the backstory, the nearby city of Mombasa, renamed New Mombasa, has become a final port of call for spacefaring traffic. To take advantage of its fortuitous proximity to New Mombasa, Voi refocused its resources from agriculture and tourism to the more lucrative pursuit of heavy industry. This shift resulted in major expansion of the town, which eventually absorbed the surrounding towns of Gutini, Ikanga, and Mariwenyi. The geography of the area has also been altered in the fictional version of Voi. Global warming has caused massive flooding of plains around the city of New Mombasa. Rather than a catastrophe, authorities viewed this event as an opportunity, and excavated a channel leading far inland to Voi. As a result, Voi became an inland port city, subsidising road transport of cargo to New Mombasa. By the time of the events in the game, Voi has been almost entirely destroyed by ruthless excavation by the Covenant, the invading extraterrestrial enemy of humanity. Only an extant sliver of warehouse complexes, which hints at the former existence of Voi, is encountered within the game. The Taita Hills to the west are also used extensively in other levels within the game. A subterranean military base, known as Crow's Nest, is located in one of the Taita hills, specifically Chawia hill, located between Mlegwa and Mwatate.
