= Taita–Taveta County =

- County
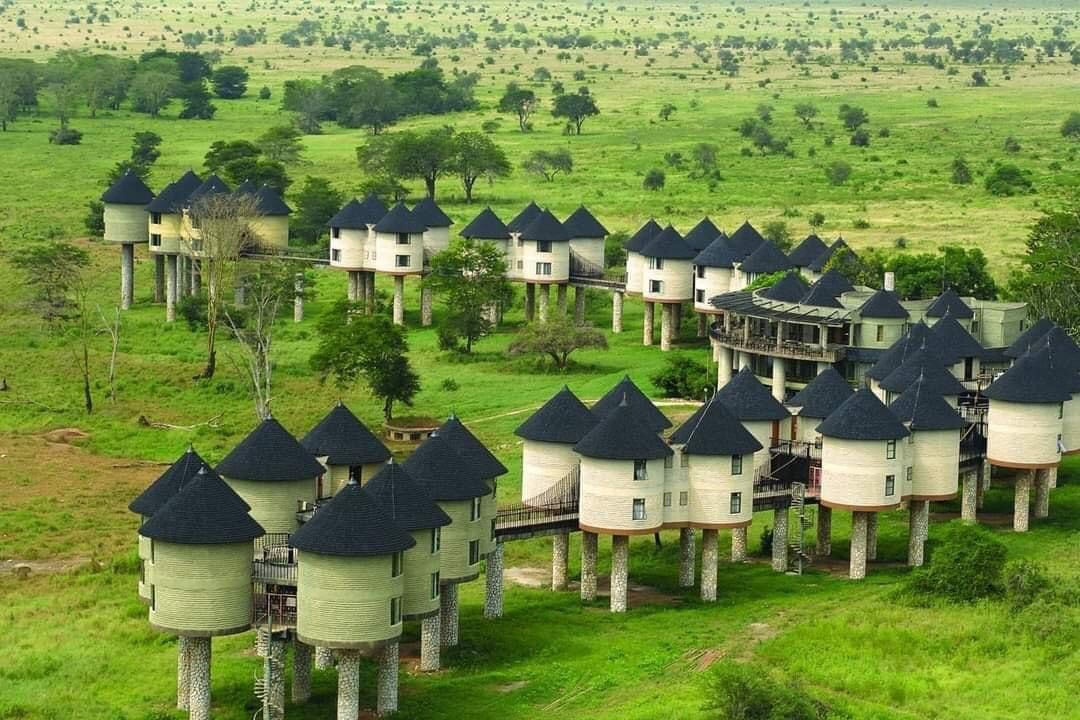
- Salt Lick Lodge

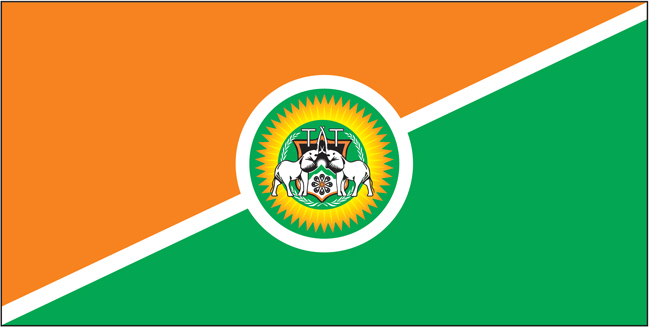
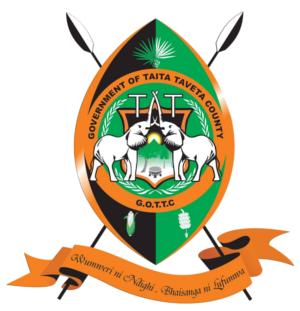
- Flag Coat of arms

- Taita-Taveta County in Kenya
- Coordinates: 3°27′S 38°24′E
- Country: Kenya
- Formed: 4 March 2013
- Capital: Mwatate

Government
  - Governor: Andrew Mwadime
  - Deputy Governor: Christine Saru Kilalo
  - Senator: Johnes Mwaruma
  - Woman Representative: Lydia Haika

Area
  - Total: 17,083.9 km^{2} (6,596.1 sq mi)
- Elevation: 2,228 m (7,310 ft)

Population (2024)
  - Total: 360,471
  - Density: 21.1000/km^{2} (54.6489/sq mi)
- Demonym(s): Taitan/Mdawida and Tavetas/watuveta

GDP (PPP)
  - Total: ▲$1.639 Billion (40th)(2022)
  - Per Capita: ▲$4,552 (2022) (21st)

GDP (NOMINAL)
  - Total: ▼$602.0 Million (2022) (40th)
  - Per Capita: ▼$1,639 (2022) (21st)
- Time zone: UTC+3 (EAT)
- Website: www.taitataveta.go.ke

Taita–Taveta County is a county in Kenya, located approximately 200 km (120 mi) northwest of Mombasa, and 360 km (220 mi) southeast of Nairobi, it has a port and major gateway to the United Republic of Tanzania through Taveta. The county headquarters are located in Mwatate. It is one of the six counties in the Coastal region of Kenya. Major towns include Voi, Taveta, Mwatate, and Wundanyi.

The population was 340,671 persons according to the 2019 national census, with population densities ranging from 14 persons per km^{2} to more than 117 persons per km^{2}. The county's climate is of varied rainfall with the lower zones receiving an average of 440 mm (17 in) of rainfall per annum and the highland areas receiving up to 1,900 mm (75 in) of rainfall. The altitude ranges from 500 to 2,300 m (1,600 to 7,500 ft) above sea level at Vuria peak, which is the county's highest point.

== Land use ==
Taita-Taveta county covers an area of 17,083.9 km^{2} (6,596.1 sq mi), of which 62% or 11,100 km^{2} (4,300 sq mi) is within Tsavo East and Tsavo West National Parks. The remaining 5,876 km^{2} (2,269 sq mi) consists of small scale farms, ranches, sisal estates, water bodies (such as Lakes Chala and Jipe in Taveta and Mzima springs), and the hilltop forests.

The lowland areas of the county outside the national parks are farms, ranches, estates, and wildlife sanctuaries which receive an average of 440 mm (17 in) of rain per annum whereas the highlands receive up to 1,900 mm (75 in). Altitudes range from 500 m (1,600 ft) above sea level to almost 2,300 m (7,500 ft; 1.4 mi) at the highest point in the county of Vuria Peak. The county has approximately 25 ranches for cattle grazing. The three operating sisal estates in the county are Teita Sisal Estate, Voi Sisal Estate and Taveta Sisal Estate. Many ranches have ventured into wildlife tourism and conservation. The Taita Hills and Saltlick Lodges sanctuary are among the well known tourism attractions in Taita Taveta.

There are 48 forests which have survived on hill tops in Taita-Taveta county of which 28 are gazetted and are under government protection and management. They range in size from small 500-square-metre (5,400-square-foot) patches with a few remnant trees to modestly vast 2-square-kilometer (490-acre) indigenous and exotic forest mountains. These forests are part of the unique Eastern Arc range of forests found mostly in eastern Tanzania with the Taita Hills forming the only Kenyan portion of that forest type.

Taita Hills forest holds a biodiversity with 13 taxa of plants and 9 taxa of animals found only in the Taita Hills. In addition, 22 plant species found in the Taita Hills forests are typical of the Eastern Arc forests. Within these indigenous forests, water flow to the lowland areas catering for both human economic activities and wildlife.

== Human – Wildlife conflict ==
Tsavo National Park covers approximately two-thirds of the land area of Taita-Taveta county, growth in human population causes conflict with wildlife.

The national population census carried out in 1969 put the number of persons in the Taita-Taveta district at 110,742. The Kenya Population and Housing Census of August 2019 found that the number of people in Taita-Taveta County was 340,671 representing an increase of 207.6% in fifty years. The growth of the human population means that the land close to the park boundaries is converted from bush land into settlements. Consequently, people have been killed by wildlife, as others lose crops and livestock.

The national government has a mechanism for financially compensating families for wildlife-related deaths and destruction of property, but residents of Taita-Taveta say the process of claiming compensation is too tedious. A television news report broadcast in September 2018 revealed that only ten out of more than 1,500 claims for compensation in the county had been paid out in the previous five years.

== Tourist attractions ==
Lake Jipe, Lake Chala, Kasigau Mountain, Taita Hills, Shomoto Hill, Aruba Dam, Mudanda Rock, Yatta Plateau, Lugard Falls, Tsavo National Reserve, Shetani Lava Flow, Mzima Springs.

== Population ==
Historical population
Year	Pop.	±%
1969	110,742	—
1979	147,597	+33.3%
1989	207,273	+40.4%
1999	246,671	+19.0%
2009	284,657	+15.4%
2019	340,671	+19.7%
Kenya Administrative Divisions: 2019 Census:

=== Religion ===
Religion in Taita–Taveta County
1. Christianity (91.0%)
2. Islam (7.40%)
3. Other religions (0.60%)
4. Atheism (1.00%)

== Sub-Counties ==
The seat of the county government of Taita-Taveta is at the small town of Wundanyi, and the largest town being Voi.

Sub-counties of Taita Taveta
Subcounty	Population
Mwatate	81,659
Taveta	91,222
Voi	111,831
Wundanyi	55,959
Total	340,671

== Constituencies ==
The county has four constituencies:

- Taveta Constituency
- Wundanyi Constituency
- Mwatate Constituency
- Voi Constituency

== Wards ==
The county has the following wards:

- Bomeni Ward
- Werugha Ward
- Rong’e Ward
- Mahoo Ward
- Kasighau Ward
- Sagala Ward
- Marungu Ward
- Kaloleni Ward
- Ngolia Ward
- Wusi/Kishamba Ward
- Mbololo Ward
- Chawia Ward
- Bura Ward
- Mwanda/Mghange Ward
- Mata Ward
- Wundanyi/Mbale Ward
- Wumingu/Kishushe Ward
- Mboghoni Ward
- Chala Ward
- Mwatate Ward

== Notable people ==
- Marylize Biubwa, intersectional feminist and activist

== See also ==
- List of ranches, estates and sanctuaries in Taita–Taveta County
- Bungule
- Dembwa
- Lushangonyi
- Miasenyi
- Ngolia
