= List of mass shootings in Kenya =

This article is a list of mass shootings in Kenya. Mass shootings are firearm-related violence with at least four casualties.

The data includes casualties of perpetrators, including self-inflicted gunshot or shooting of a perpetrator by police. The treatment of perpetrator casualties is at variance to some but not all definitions of a mass shooting used in the United States. The inclusion of injured victims in the data is also at variance with some of the US definitions that only include dead victims. However, the above treatment is consistent with that used in other Wikipedia lists of mass shootings by country.

Mass shootings in Kenya are mostly perpetrated by bandits, and are usually motivated by access to resources and cattle. Cattle rustling and banditry are common, as is retaliatory bandit attacks against locals and police.

== 21st century ==
Date	Location	Dead	Injured	Total	Description
7 April 2025	Meru County	3	several	5+	Gun battle with bandits.
23 March 2025	Garissa	6	4	10	An Al-Shabaab attack on a Kenyan police station.
27 February 2025	Samburu County	2	10	12	Bus under police escort is fired upon by bandits.
6 July 2024	Mutuati, Igembe North, Meru County	5	0	5	Bandits Attack Police and Herders.
16 August 2023	Garissa	6	0	6	Clan clash.
12 - 13 June 2023	Meru County	5	0	5	Bandit attack.
12 April 2023	Baringo County	1	3	4	Bandit attack.
6 April 2023	Lami Nyeusi, West Pokot County	5	0	5	Bandit attack.
11 March 2023	Turkana County	0	4	4	Bandit attack.
4 March 2023	Kalemngorok, Turkana County	2	4	6	Bandit raid.
17 December 2022	Ngarenddare, Oldonyiro, Isiolo County	2	3	5	Retaliatory bandit attack.
25 September 2022	Turkana County	11	0	11	Bandit attack leads to eleven deaths including eight police officers
10 June 2022	Isiolo County	1	6	7	Bandit attack.
1 May 2022	Turkana County	0	9	9	Bus fired upon by bandits.
8 April 2022	Isiolo County	9	4	13	Bandit attack.
26 February 2022	Kerio Valley	8	0	8	Ambush by bandits.
17 February 2022	Elgeyo Marakwet County	1	15	16	Armed bandits attack three school buses.
31 January 2022	Mandera County	10	13	23	2022 Mandera attack: Following the bombing of a bus, Al-Shabaab militants attacked the damaged bus and shot people, injuring and killing several.
4 December 2021	Mandera	2	12	14	Al-Shabaab militants ambushed a lorry carrying 20 officers on the Rhamu-Mandera Road, killing two police officers and injuring at least 12 others.
10 November 2021	Laikipia Conservancy	4	0	4	Bandits shot and kill two General Service Unit (GSU) and two Kenyan Defence force officers.
21 July 2021	Kerio Valley	5	0	5	Retaliatory bandit attack.
20 June 2021	Isiolo County	5	0	5	Bandit attack.
6 December 2019	Wargadadud and Kutulu, Wajir County	11	4	15	2019 Kenya bus shooting: A gunman associated with militant group Al-Shabaab shot and killed eleven people including seven Kenya Police officers on a bus.
15 - 16 January 2019	Westlands District, Nairobi	27 (Note: Including the perpetrator or suspect)	30	57	Nairobi DusitD2 complex attack: Four attackers associated with Harakat Al-Shabaab al-Mujahideen carried out a mass shooting for over 22 hours which left 21 civilians, one Kenyan soldier and some 30 injured.
21 November 2018	Kilifi County	0	5	5	Bandit attack in Kilifi and kidnapping of Italian national.
14 March 2017	Tiaty, Baringo County	11	0	11	Bandit attack.
21 December 2015	Near village of El Wak	2	3	5	A man shot and killed two people and injured three others injured in an attack on a bus.
4 May 2015	Turkana-East Pokot border	47	30+	77+	Bandit attack on Turkana-East Pokot border village.
2 April 2015	Garissa	148	79+	227	Garissa University College attack: Four gunmen of militant groups Al-Qaeda and Al-Shabaab stormed the Garissa University College where they shot and killed 148 people, injured at least 79 and took 700 students hostage.
15 March 2015	Mandera	4	3	7	Bandit attack.
22 November 2014	Mandera	28	0	28	Approximately 100 Gunmen shot and kill 28 people. The armed men stopped the bus and divided individuals into two groups of Somalis and non Somali, before the shooting.
2 November 2014	Turkana County	22	0	22	Bandit shot and killed 22 people including 20 police officers.
6 July 2014	Lamu County	9	0	9	July 2014 Kenya attacks: Two separate mass shooting attacks perpetrated by Al-Shabaab.
6 July 2014	Tana River County	20	0	20	July 2014 Kenya attacks: Two separate mass shooting attacks perpetrated by Al-Shabaab.
15 June 2014	Mpeketoni	60+		60+	Mpeketoni attacks: Militant group Al-Shabaab shot and killed at least 60 people.
4 April 2014	Turkana County	5	4	9	Bandit attack.
10 December 2013	Liboi	8	0	8	Eight killed in unknown attack
21 September 2013	Westlands District, Nairobi	71	~200	271	Westgate shopping mall attack: Four masked gunmen associated with militant group Al-Shabaab attacked the Westgate shopping mall in Nairobi, where they shot and killed 62 civilians, five Kenyan soldiers and approximately wounded 200 people.
10 November 2012	Samburu County	37	4	41	Bandit attack on police and homeguard.
30 May 2012	Liboi	0	4	4	Four policemen injured in bandit attack.
14 October 2011	Tractor village, Ngaremara Division, Isiolo County	7	Unknown	7+	Bandit attack.
18 September 2008	Samburu North District	3	2	5	Bandit attack.
12 July 2005	Marsabit District	56	Unknown	56	Turbi massacre: A force of around one thousand Borana bandits conducted a series of six raids on Gabra villages where they shot and killed fifty-six people.
5 September 2002	Isiolo County	6	Several	8+	Bandit attack.

== See also ==
- Crime in Kenya
- Ethnic conflicts in Kenya
- List of massacres in Kenya
