= Somali–Kenyan conflict =

Long-term armed struggle between Kenya and Somalia

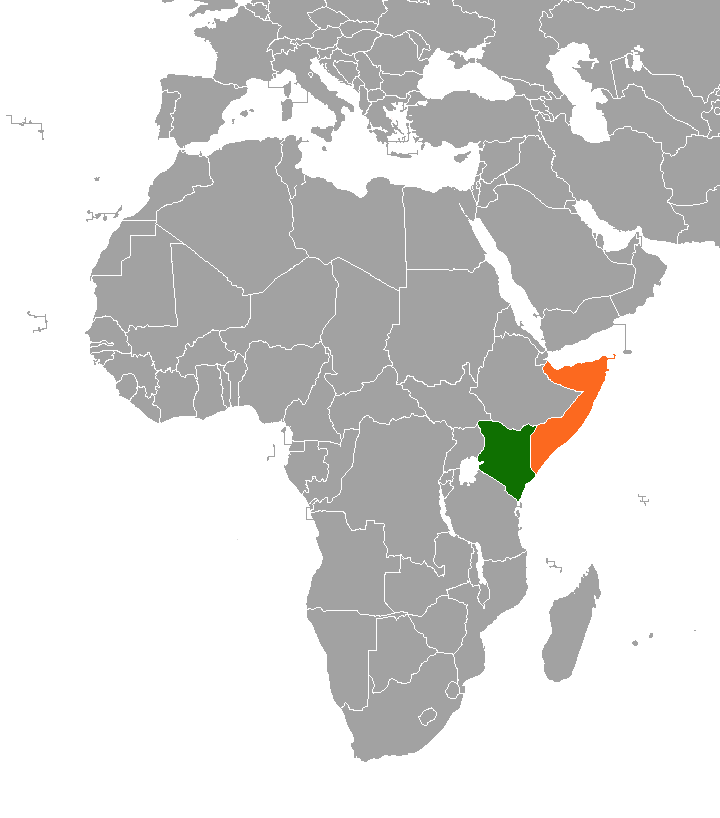
- Kenya (Green) and Somalia (Orange)
Date	1963 – present
Location	Africa
Status	Ongoing

Belligerents
Kenya	Somalia

Commanders and leaders
William Ruto	Hassan Sheikh Mohamud

The Somali–Kenyan conflicts rooted in historical, ethnic, and territorial complexities, span from the colonial era to the present, driven by competing national interests, clan dynamics, and regional instability. Problems have ranged from skirmishes between the two parties and have led to terrorist attacks, police harassment, extortion, home invasions, physical violence, and massacres perpetrated against Somalis and Kenyans.

== Background ==
During the Scramble for Africa, European powers divided Somali-inhabited territories, creating lasting tensions. The Northern Frontier District (NFD), encompassing present-day Garissa, Wajir, Mandera, Isiolo and Marsabit counties in Kenya, was predominantly inhabited by Somalis. Under British colonial rule, the NFD was administered separately from the rest of British Kenya, with restrictive policies that marginalised its nomadic pastoralist populations.

In 1925, the modern day Jubaland region, which was part of the NFD region, was ceded to Italy as a reward for supporting the Allies in World War I, becoming the Italian colony of Trans-Juba. This transfer was made without consulting local populations and sowed seeds of resentment, and fueled Somali nationalist aspirations for a unified Greater Somalia, encompassing Somali-inhabited areas in Kenya, Ethiopia, Djibouti, and Somalia.

As Kenya approached independence in 1963, the British conducted a plebiscite in the NFD region, revealing strong Somali support for secession and unification with the newly independent Somali Republic (formed in 1960 by the merger of British and Italian Somaliland). However, the United Kingdom, prioritising Kenyan territorial integrity, ignored these sentiments and handed the NFD to Kenya, disregarding Somali aspirations. This decision, coupled with statements from Kikuyu leaders like Jomo Kenyatta dismissing Somali demands, set the stage for conflict.

After Kenya’s independence, ethnic Somalis in the NFD, supported by the Somali Republic, launched the Shifta War to secede and join Somalia. The term “shifta” (Swahili for “bandit”) was used by the Kenyans to delegitimise the insurgency. The Northern Province People’s Progressive Party (NPPPP), advocating for secession, faced repression, with their leaders arrested or exiled. The insurgency involved guerrilla attacks, cattle raids, and skirmishes, with Somalia providing sporadic support. Kenya responded with harsh counterinsurgency measures, including forced villagisation, livestock confiscation, and collective punishment, disrupting the local people’s way of life.

The war ended with a ceasefire in 1967, facilitated by the Organisation of African Unity at the Arusha Conference, where Somalia’s Prime Minister Muhammad Haji Ibrahim Egal agreed to suspend hostilities. However, the conflict left lasting grievances, with Kenyan Somalis feeling targeted, marginalised and subjected to state suspicion.

== Petty skirmishes ==
Between 2010 and 2012, Somali herders in the Kitui District in the Eastern Province clashed with the Kenyan Kamba community along the Kitui and Tana River boundary. The conflict was related to pastureland for livestock.

== Historical massacres ==
=== Garissa massacre ===
The Garissa Massacre was a 1980 massacre of ethnic Somali residents by the Kenyan government in the Garissa District of the North Eastern Province. The incident occurred when government forces, acting on the premise of flushing out a local hoodlum known as Abdi Madobe, set fire to a residential estate called Bulla Kartasi, killing people and raping women. They then forcefully interned the populace in a primary school for three days without food or water, resulting in over 3000 deaths.

=== Wagalla Massacre ===
The Wagalla massacre was a massacre of ethnic Somalis by Kenyan security forces on 10 February 1984 in Wajir District, North Eastern Province.

The massacre took place on 10 February 1984 at the Wagalla Airstrip. The facility is situated approximately 15 km (9 mi) west of the district capital of Wajir in the North Eastern Province, a region primarily inhabited by ethnic Somalis. Kenyan troops had descended on the area to reportedly help diffuse clan-related conflict. However, according to eyewitness testimony, about 5,000 Somali men were then taken to an airstrip and prevented from accessing water and food for five days before being executed by Kenyan soldiers.

According to the chairman of The Truth, Justice and Reconciliation Commission of Kenya, a government oversight body that had been formed in response to the 2008 Kenyan post-election violence, the Wagalla massacre represents the worst human rights violation in Kenya's history.

=== Garissa University College Massacre ===
On 2 April 2015, gunmen stormed the Garissa University College in Garissa, Kenya, killing 147 students, and injuring 79 or more. The militant group Al-Shabaab from southern Somalia, which the gunmen claimed to be from, took responsibility for the attack. The gunmen took over 700 students hostage, freeing Muslims and killing those who identified as Christians. The siege ended the same day, when all four of the attackers were killed. Five men were later arrested in connection with the attack, and a bounty was placed for the arrest of a suspected organizer.

The attack was the deadliest in Kenya since the 1998 United States embassy bombings, and is the second deadliest overall, with more casualties than the 2002 Mombasa attacks, the 2013 Westgate shopping mall attack, the 2014 Nairobi bus bombings, the 2014 Gikomba bombings, the 2014 Mpeketoni attacks and the 2014 Lamu attacks.

== 2012–2013 conflict ==
In October 2011, the coordinated Operation Linda Nchi between the Somali military and the Kenyan military began against Al-Shabaab. The mission was officially led by the Somali Armed Forces, with the Kenyan forces providing a support role.

Since the Operation Linda Nchi began, Al-Shabaab vowed retaliation against the Kenyan authorities. At the militant group's urging, a significant and increasing number of terrorist attacks in Kenya have since been carried out by local Kenyans, many of whom are recent converts to Islam. Estimates in 2012 placed the figure of Kenyan fighters at around 10% of Al-Shabaab's total forces. Referred to as the "Kenyan Mujahideen" by Al-Shabaab's core members, the converts are typically young and overzealous, poverty making them easier targets for the group's recruitment activities. Because the Kenyan insurgents have a different profile from the Somali and Arab militants that allows them to blend in with the general population of Kenya, they are also often harder to track. Reports suggest that Al-Shabaab is attempting to build an even more multi-ethnic generation of fighters in the larger region. One such recent convert who helped carry out the Kampala bombings but now cooperates with the Kenyan police believes that in doing so, the group is essentially trying to use local Kenyans to do its "dirty work" for it while its core members escape unscathed. According to diplomats, Muslim areas in coastal Kenya and Tanzania, such as Mombasa and Zanzibar, are also especially vulnerable for recruitment.

On 18 November 2012, 10 people were killed and 25 seriously injured when an explosion ripped apart a route 28 mass transit mini-bus (matatu) in Eastleigh. The blast was believed to have been an improvised explosive device or bomb of some sort. Looting and destruction of Somali-owned homes and shops by angry mobs of young Kenyans ensued. Somalis defended their property, and interpreted the bus explosion as a pretext for non-Somalis to steal from their community.

On 20 November 2012, Kenya Defence Forces (KDF) swooped on Garissa in a military operation. KDF soldiers subsequently burned down the local market and shot at a crowd of protesters, killing a woman and injuring 10 people. Another 35 residents were also receiving treatment at the provincial hospital after being assaulted by the soldiers, including a chief and two pupils. A group of MPs led by Farah Maalim accused Kenyan officers of inciting violence, raping women and shooting at students, and threatened to take the matter to the International Court of Justice (ICJ) if the perpetrators were not brought to justice. Maalim also suggested that the deployment of the soldiers was unconstitutional and had not received the requisite parliamentary approval, and that the ensuing rampage cost Garissa entrepreneurs over Sh1.5 billion to Sh2 billion in missed revenue. Additionally, Sheikhs with the CPK threatened to sue the military commanders for crimes against humanity committed during the operation. However, general harassment of the Somali community by Kenyan policemen continued, with some officers going as far as invading the homes of Somali businesspeople to steal precious jewelry, foreign currencies and electronic devices, including expensive phones, laptops, and other personal accessories.

By January 2013, a mass exodus of Somali residents was reported. Hundreds of Somali entrepreneurs withdrew between Sh10 to Sh40 billion from their bank accounts in Kenya, with the intention of reinvesting most of that money back home in Somalia. The collective departures most affected Eastleigh's real estate sector, as landlords struggled to find Kenyans able to afford the high rates of the apartments and shops vacated by the Somalis.

The maritime border dispute is a problem that Kenya and Somali claims over and the solution was held by the ICJ

== Coastal Oil Field Dispute ==
In February 2019, Kenyan officials have alleged that Somalia is engaged in an inappropriate auctioning of drilling rights along the African coast of the Ocean. The International Court of Arbitration has scheduled procedures for September 2019 concerning maritime territorial waters, which Somali sources indicate is being pre-empted by the Kenyan officials. Kenya demanded Somalia to abandon its ICJ case for bilateral discussion. Somalia sees this as delaying tactics as discussion did not produce results between 2009 and 2014. Kenya gave mining rights to France and Italian companies in 2009, however, accused Somalia of doing the same. Somalia denied the accusation. This seems to create confusion. The only hope is for ICJ to make a binding decision.

== Other conflicts ==
=== Rhamu incident ===
Also known as Battle of Rhamu, this brief armed conflict between Kenya and Somalia occurred when the latter invaded the Northern Frontier District on the eve of the Ogaden War. A force of 3000+ Somali soldiers supported by the Somali Air Force attacked a border post, killing a number of Kenyan police officers and soldiers. The Somali army did not occupy the area, as the objective of their mission was to invade Ethiopia through Kenya. Rhamu, situated on the Ethiopian-Kenyan border, lay on the road to the Sidamo region, and was considered a strategic point of entrance. Upon learning of the incursion, the Kenyan government immediately ordered a temporary retreat from the NFD, after which they would mobilize the entire Kenyan army and dispatch them to the region. Fearing escalation with Somalia, the Kenyatta regime requested aid and interference from the UK if the situation degenerated into a full-scale war. The Somali government denied the invasion, and claimed to have no knowledge of the incident.

== See also ==
- Kenya–Somalia relations
- Ethnic conflicts in Kenya
- Ethiopian–Somali conflict
- List of massacres in Kenya
