= Terrorism in Kenya =

- Part of the Somali Civil War
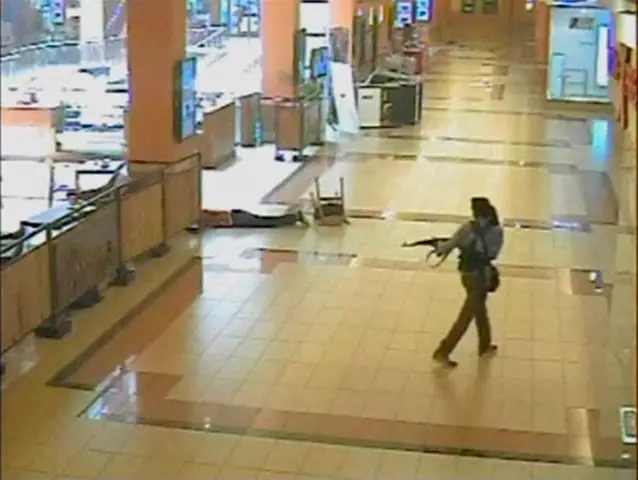
- Omar Nabhan during the Westgate shopping mall attack on 21 September 2013, where 71 were killed
| Date | 7 August 1998 – present |
| Location | Kenya |
| Status | Ongoing |

Belligerents
| Kenya; Kenya Defence Forces; Kenya Police; GSU; APS; National Intelligence Service | Jihadist groups: Al-Shabaab; Local gangs and insurgent groups: Mungiki |

Commanders and leaders
| (Kenya) Daniel arap Moi (Kenya) Mwai Kibaki (Kenya) Uhuru Kenyatta (Kenya) William Ruto (Kenya) Daudi Rerimoi Chepkong'a Tonje (Kenya) Joseph Raymond Edward Kibwana (Kenya) Jeremiah Kianga (Kenya) Julius Waweru Karangi (Kenya) Samson Mwathethe (Kenya) Robert Kariuki Kibochi (Kenya) Francis Omondi Ogolla (Kenya) Charles Muriu Kahariri | Ahmed Diriye; Ahmed Abdi Godane †; Aden Ayro |

Many terrorist attacks have occurred in Kenya during the 20th and 21st centuries. In 1980, the Jewish-owned Norfolk hotel was attacked by the Palestine Liberation Organization (PLO). In 1998, the US embassy was bombed in Nairobi, as was the Israeli-owned Paradise hotel in 2002 in Mombasa. In 2013, the Somali jihadist group al-Shabaab killed 67 people at Nairobi's Westgate Shopping Mall. There have also been many other attacks.

== Background ==
In July 1976, President Jomo Kenyatta allowed an Israel Defense Forces task force to cross Kenyan airspace and refuel at Jomo Kenyatta International Airport, on its way to Entebbe International Airport in Uganda. Israel required help from an East African country for the success of its Operation Entebbe raid to extract people from a hostage crisis. Without it, Israel lacked the logistical capacity to aerially refuel four to six aircraft so far from Israeli airspace. Perceived as Western interest and Israeli support, this incident was responded to with anger from Islamic extremists.

== Major incidents ==
=== 1975 Nairobi bombing and JM Kariuki murder ===
In early 1975, the first bombs to strike independent Kenya exploded. In February, there were two blasts in central Nairobi, inside the Starlight nightclub and in a travel bureau near the Hilton hotel. The day after the second explosion, JM Kariuki revealed in Parliament that his car had been hit "by what seemed to be bullets". There were rumours of a botched attempt on his life. They were followed by a more serious blast in a Nairobi bus on 1 March, which killed 30 people. Despite a massive public outcry and a police manhunt, no arrests were made. For several days thereafter, the city lived in fear, destabilized by numerous telephone bomb hoaxes.

On 2 March 1975, the day after the OTC bus blast, security officials including General Service Unit commander Ben Gethi publicly accosted JM Kariuki outside the Hilton hotel. Various police officers, including police commissioner Patrick Shaw, had been following JM throughout the day. Gethi asked Kariuki to accompany the security officials into a convoy of cars and took him to an unknown destination.

The bombings stopped after the news of the disappearance and murder of JM Kariuki became public.

=== 1980 Norfolk Hotel bombing ===
The Norfolk hotel in Nairobi, owned by a prominent member of the local Jewish community, was bombed on 31 December 1980. The bomb killed 20 people of several nationalities, wounded 87 more, and destroyed much of the west wing. It was believed to be an act of revenge by pro-Palestinian militants for Kenya's supporting role in Israel's Operation Entebbe.

According to reports about that incident, international security agencies in conjunction with the Kenya Police had a prime suspect within hours. He was identified as 34-year-old Qaddura Mohammed Abdel al-Hamid of Morocco, and he was said to have checked into the Norfolk Hotel in Nairobi in the last week of 1980. Al-Hamid was found to have paid for his room up until New Year's Day, but slipped away on the afternoon of 31 December. He had boarded a plane for Saudi Arabia by the time the guests at the Norfolk assembled for a New Year's Eve dinner.

=== 1998 United States embassy bombings ===
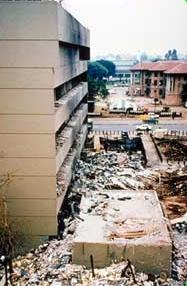
Aftermath at the U.S. embassy in Nairobi

On 7 August, between 10:30 a.m. and 10:40 a.m. local time, suicide bombers in trucks laden with explosives parked outside the embassies in Dar es Salaam and Nairobi, and almost simultaneously detonated. 213 people were killed in the Nairobi blast, while 11 were killed in Dar es Salaam. An estimated 4,000 in Nairobi were wounded, and another 85 in Dar es Salaam. Seismological readings analysed after the bombs indicated energy of between 3–17 tons of high explosive material. Although the attacks were directed at American facilities, the vast majority of casualties were local citizens of the two African countries; 12 Americans were killed, including two Central Intelligence Agency employees in the Nairobi embassy, and one U.S. Marine, Sergeant Jesse Aliganga, a Marine Security Guard at the Nairobi embassy.

The explosion damaged the embassy building and collapsed the neighbouring Ufundi Building where most victims were killed, mainly students and staff of a secretarial college housed there. The heat from the blast was channelled between the buildings towards Haile Selassie Avenue where a packed commuter bus was burned. Windows were shattered in a radius of nearly 1 kilometre.

Following the attacks, a group calling itself the "Liberation Army for Holy Sites" took credit for the bombings. American investigators believe the term was a cover used by Egyptian Islamic Jihad, who had actually perpetrated the bombing. The attacks brought Osama bin Laden and Ayman al-Zawahiri—and their terrorist organization al-Qaeda—to the attention of the American public for the first time, and resulted in the Federal Bureau of Investigation (FBI) placing bin Laden on its ten most-wanted fugitives list.

=== 2002 Kikambala Hotel bombing and Arkia Airlines missile attack, Mombasa ===
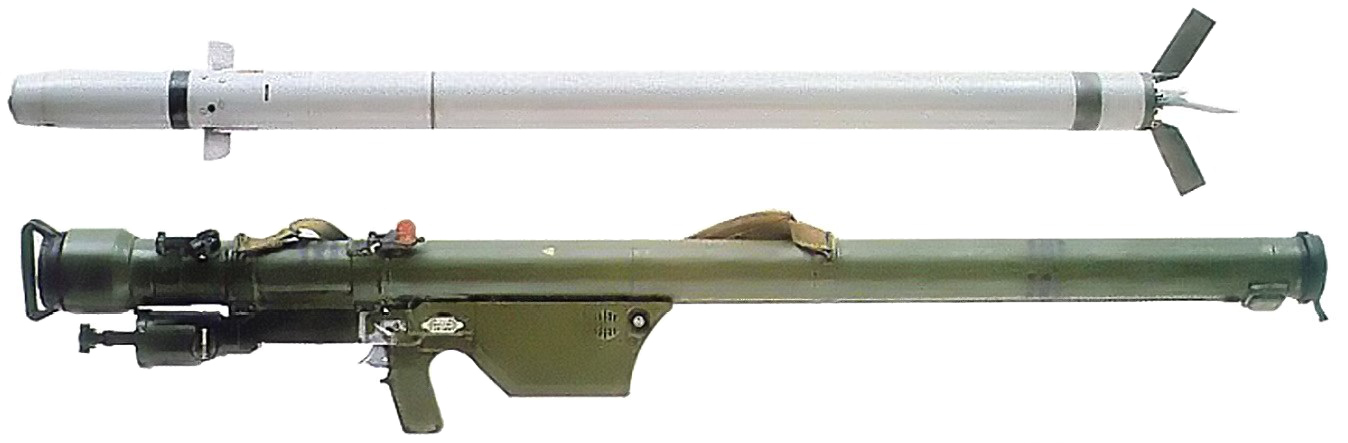
An example of a Strela-2 surface-to-air missile system as fired at the Boeing 757 airliner during take-off

On 28 November 2002 two missiles were fired at, but missed, an Israeli passenger airliner as it took off from Mombasa airport. Subsequently, there was an attack on the Kikambala Hotel when it was receiving Israeli tourists.

The hotel blast occurred just after some 60 visitors had checked into the hotel, all of them from Israel, hotel officials said. 13 were killed and 80 injured. Ten Kenyans died, nine of whom were employed by the hotel, most of them were said to be traditional dancers who came to welcome the 140 guests arriving from Israel by state-chartered jet and three Israelis, two of whom were children. In an overnight operation that went on into the early hours, four Israeli military Hercules planes with teams of doctors and psychologists flew into Mombasa and evacuated injured Israeli tourists and all those who wanted to leave.

Almost simultaneously, two shoulder-launched Strela-2 (SA-7) surface-to-air missiles were fired at another chartered Boeing 757 airliner owned by Israel-based Arkia Airlines as it took off from Moi International Airport. The Arkia charter company had a regular weekly service flying tourists between Tel Aviv and Mombasa. Kenyan police discovered a missile launcher and two missile casings in the Changamwe area of Mombasa, about two kilometres (1.25 miles) from the airport.

Police sought MR Bajnaf Mselem Swaleh Mahdi Khamisi, who they believe may lead them to Fazul, the main suspect.

=== 2012 al-Shabaab attacks ===
In October 2011, a coordinated operation between the Somali military and the Kenyan military began against the al-Shabaab group of jihadi insurgents in southern Somalia. The mission was officially led by the Somali army, with the Kenyan forces providing a support role. Since then, a series of explosions have rocked various areas in Kenya, bombings which are believed to have been retaliatory attacks by Al-Shabaab. In early June 2012, Kenyan forces were formally integrated into AMISOM.

According to the US Embassy, in 2011 and 2012 there were at least 17 attacks involving grenades or explosive devices in Kenya, resulting in at least 48 deaths and around 200 people injured. Nine of the attacks occurred in North Eastern Province, including locations in Dadaab, Wajir, and Garissa. Four attacks occurred in Nairobi, and four in Mombasa. Targets included police stations and police vehicles, nightclubs and bars, churches, a religious gathering, a downtown building of small shops, and a bus station. One attack involved two simultaneous assaults on churches in Garissa on 1 July 2012. In this attack, 17 people were killed and around 50 people were injured.

=== 2013 Westgate Mall shooting ===
On 21 September 2013, al-Shabaab associated gunmen targeted and shot customers at Nairobi's Westgate Shopping Mall. At least 67 people were killed in the attack.

=== 2014 Mpeketoni attacks ===
Between 15 and 17 June 2014, more than 60 people were killed in attacks in and near Mpeketoni, Lamu County. Al-Shabaab claimed responsibility, but the Kenyan President Uhuru Kenyatta asserted that the attacks were organized by local politicians with ties to a network of gangs. Correspondents from the area suggested that the attacks may have been motivated by ethnic or religious hatred, or revenge for land grabbing.

On 15 June 2014, about 50 masked gunmen hijacked a van and raided a police station in the predominantly Christian town of Mpeketoni, as well as burning hotels, restaurants, and government offices. At least 53 people were reportedly killed during the attack, and eight others were unaccounted for as of 18 June. Most of the dead Kenyans were Kikuyus.

On 22 November 2014, 28 people on board a bus were executed in the Omar Jillo area of Mandera County in the north-eastern tip of Kenya. According to reports, the bus was hijacked by suspected members of the Islamist militant organisation al-Shabaab who identified and killed the non-Muslim passengers. Ten days later in the early hours of 2 December, news emerged of another brutal attack. This time, 36 people had been killed at a quarry in Koromei in the same county.

=== 2015 Garissa attack ===
In April 2015, gunmen stormed the Garissa University College, killing almost 150 people and wounding several others. The attackers claimed to be from the Al-Shabaab militant group, and indicated that they were retaliating over non-Muslims occupying Muslim territory. The militants took several students hostage, freeing Muslims but withholding Christians. Over 500 students were still unaccounted for.

=== 2019 Nairobi DusitD2 complex attack ===
On 15 January 2019, four gunmen attacked the DusitD2 complex at 14 Riverside Drive junction around 2:30 p.m. Before they were contained and brought down by the Kenya security forces, the terrorists killed 21 people and injured several others in the process.

=== 2020 Camp Simba attack ===
On 5 January 2020, about 20 Al-Shabaab personnel attacked Camp Simba, the attack destroyed five aircraft and damaged one along with the destruction of two Oshkosh M-ATV and several fuel tankers. U.S. Army Specialist Henry Mayfield Jr was killed in the attack along with two other civilian contractors. After about an hour of fighting five Al-Shabaab soldiers were killed and five more arrested.

== Lesser incidents ==
- 13 June 2010: During a "NO" campaign rally in Uhuru Park in Nairobi, a petrol bomb was thrown into the crowds as the meeting dispersed at dusk, sparking a stampede as people fled. Some witnesses reported that there were two separate explosions. Five people were killed and as many as 75 were injured. The meeting was called by a church leader to campaign against a proposed new constitution in a referendum.
- 17 September 2011: A grenade shell was recovered within the premises of the office of the Prime Minister. However, police cooled off the issue saying it was not targeting anybody.
- 24 October 2011: A Russian made F1 grenade was detonated in the Mwauras disco in Nairobi, injuring 14 people. The police linked the attack to Al-Shabaab. It was followed by a second attack that evening against a bus stop that killed at least one person and injured eight. Elgiva Bwire Oliacha (alias Mohamed Seif), who claimed to be a member of Al-Shabaab, was arrested, pleaded guilty for both attacks, and was sentenced to life in prison.
- 30 September 2012: The Sunday school of St Polycarp's church in Nairobi was attacked with grenades. According to newspaper reports, one child was killed. Police blamed the attack on Al-Shabaab sympathizers.
- 14 December 2013 – 2013 Nairobi bus attack: A hand grenade was thrown onto a minibus in Eastleigh, a Somali-dominated suburb of Nairobi, killing four people and wounding 36 others.
- 14 March 2014: In Mombasa, two terrorists were arrested while driving a car carrying two improvised bombs.
- 19 March 2014: Kenyan police unintentionally parked a car outside their office that was carrying a massive cache of terrorist explosives, including 130 pounds of plastic.
- 1 April 2014: In the Eastleigh, Nairobi, six people were killed and dozens more injured when terrorists exploded bombs at two separate locations about three hundred meters apart.
- 9 April 2014: It was reported that twelve shops in Nairobi were being investigated for funneling money to terrorists.
- 23 April 2014 – Nairobi police station bombing: A car bomb exploded in front of a police station in Nairobi's Pangani quarter, killing four people including two police.
- 3 May 2014: Three people were killed and 15 were injured when a hand grenade was detonated inside a bus in Mombasa. In another incident on the same day, an improvised explosive device was deposited within a bag on a beach. The bag was noticed, and no casualties were reported after "people took cover".
- 4 May 2014 – 2014 Nairobi bus bombings: On the Thika Highway in Nairobi, terrorists exploded homemade bombs on two commuter buses, nearly simultaneously and about a kilometer apart. Three people were killed and 62 others were injured.
- 16 May 2014 – 2014 Gikomba bombings: Two improvised explosive devices were detonated simultaneously in the Gikomba market in Nairobi, killing at least 12 people and injuring 70.
- 23 May 2014: A grenade was thrown at a police vehicle carrying two suspects in Mombasa. Two people were injured.
- 5–6 July 2014 – 2014 Lamu attacks: Heavily armed men attacked the villages of Hindi in Lamu County and Gamba in Tana River County. At least 29 people were killed.
- 22 November 2014: Gunmen attacked a bus traveling from Mandera to Nairobi, killing 28 people, mostly teachers and government workers heading to Nairobi for the December holidays.
- 2 December 2014: Al-Shabaab militants attacked and killed 36 quarry workers, many of whom were non-Muslims, near Mandera.
- 26 May 2015 – May 2015 Garissa ambush: While rushing to the aid of colleagues who had been hit by a landmine explosion in the village of Yumbis, Garissa County, police were ambushed by Al-Shabaab. A gun battle ensued and four police vehicles were set ablaze. Al-Shabab claimed that at least 20 policemen were killed but an interior ministry spokesman said only one officer was wounded. The previous week Al-Shabaab had occupied Yumbis (70 km north of Garissa) for a day.
- 21 December 2015: Two people were killed and three others injured when gunmen, believed to be part of Al-Shabaab, attacked a bus travelling from Mandera to Nairobi, and a lorry, near the village of El Wak on the Somali border. Muslim passengers helped dress non-Muslims in Islamic headscarves to prevent the gunmen from identifying them; and refused to separate from non-Muslims when ordered to do so. A non-Muslim bus passenger who tried to run away was shot dead along with a non-Muslim person in the lorry.
- 26 January 2019: An explosive device blew up in Latema road, Nairobi injuring two people.
- 4 December 2021: Two police officers were shot dead and at least 12 other officers injured when Al-Shabaab militants ambushed a lorry carrying 20 officers on the Rhamu-Mandera Road. Later on the same day, a suspected militant was killed by special forces in the Bambo area of Mandera County.
- 3 January 2022: Six Christians were killed in a suspected Al-Shabaab Attack in Widhu village, Lamu West.
- 2 February 2022: 13 people were killed by a roadside bomb in Mandera County. Al-Shabaab was suspected.
- 18 January 2024: A police officer was killed and four others were injured after an IED detonated inside a donkey cart at a checkpoint on the Kenya-Somalia border in Mandera County.

== Anti-terrorism legislation ==
The Kenyan Parliament is working on legislation focused on reducing terrorism.

There has been opposition from Muslim, NGO and human rights groups. The bill aims to allow police to tap private communications, seize property and access the bank details of suspected terrorists.

President Mwai Kibaki approved the Prevention of Terrorist Act 2012, Kenya's first piece of anti-terrorist legislation to be passed, on 2 October 2012.

== Dynamics ==
At the urging of al-Shabaab, an increasing number of terrorist attacks in Kenya have been carried out by local Kenyans, many of whom are recent converts to Islam. Estimates in 2012 placed the figure of Kenyan fighters at around 10% of Al-Shabaab's total forces.

Referred to as the "Kenyan mujahideen" by al-Shabaab's core members, the converts are typically young and overzealous, poverty making them easier targets for the outfit's recruitment activities. Because the Kenyan insurgents have a different profile from the Somali and Arab militants that allows them to blend in with the general population of Kenya, they are also often harder to track. Reports suggest that Al-Shabaab is attempting to build an even more multi-ethnic generation of fighters in the larger region.

One such recent convert who helped plan the 2010 Kampala bombings, but now cooperates with the Kenyan Police, believes that in doing so, the group is essentially trying to use local Kenyans to do its "dirty work" for it while its core members escape unscathed. According to diplomats, Muslim areas in coastal Kenya and Tanzania, such as Mombasa and Zanzibar, are also especially vulnerable for recruitment.

== See also ==
- Crime in Kenya
- Ethnic conflicts in Kenya
- List of massacres in Kenya
- Aboud Rogo
- Somali and Kenyan conflict
