= List of bus attacks =

Bus attacks are a crime in which passengers and/or drivers of a bus are targeted, oftentimes in an act of terrorism. The high frequency of bus attacks are attributed to the ease of the attackers' access to a large group of unprotected people within an enclosed space. As such, it is one of the most common methods of public transportation being targeted or used as weapons, with a high potential for mass-casualties. Bus attacks occur most commonly in regions such as South Asia, Middle East and North Africa, including countries such as Pakistan and Israel.

== Afghanistan ==
- Kabul bombings (2021)

== Azerbaijan ==
- Tbilisi–Agdam bus bombing (1990)

== China ==
- Ürümqi bus bombings (1997)

== Germany ==
- Borussia Dortmund team bus bombing (2017)

== India ==
- Mumbai bus bombing (2002)

== Israel ==
- Ma'ale Akrabim massacre (1954)
- Avivim school bus bombing (1970)
- Coastal Road massacre (1978)
- Afula bus suicide bombing (6 April 1994)
- Hadera bus station suicide bombing (13 April 1994)
- Dizengoff Street bus bombing (October 1994)
- Ramat Gan bus bombing (July 1995)
- Ramat Eshkol bus bombing (August 1995)
- Jaffa Road bus bombings (1996)
- Camp 80 junction bus 823 attack (November 2001)
- Haifa bus 16 suicide bombing (December 2001)
- Umm al-Fahm bus bombing (March 2002)
- Patt Junction Bus bombing (June 2002)
- Allenby Street bus bombing (September 2002)
- Kiryat Menachem bus bombing (November 2002)
- Tel Aviv Central bus station massacre (January 2003)
- French Hill suicide bombings (May 2003)
- Haifa bus 37 suicide bombing (March 2003)
- Davidka Square bus bombing (June 2003)
- Shmuel HaNavi bus bombing (August 2003)
- 2004 Jerusalem bus 19 bombing (January 2004)
- Liberty Bell Park bus bombing (February 2004)
- Beersheba bus bombings (August 2004)
- Jerusalem bus stop bombing (2011)
- Tel Aviv bus bombing (2012)
- Bat Yam bus bombing (2013)
- Jerusalem bus bombing (2016)

== Kenya ==
- Nairobi bus bombing (1975)
- Eastleigh bus attack (2013)
- Nairobi bus bombings (2014)

== Lebanon ==
- Beirut bus massacre (1975)

== Pakistan ==
- Bhai Pheru bus bombing (1996)
- Karachi bus bombing (2002)
- Peshawar bus bombing (2016)

== The Philippines ==
- Bukidnon bus bombing (2014)

== Russia ==
- Krasnodar bus bombing (1971)
- Volgograd bus bombing (2013)

== Serbia ==
- Lužane bus bombing (1999)
- Podujevo bus bombing (2001)

== Sri Lanka ==
- Colombo central bus station bombing (1987)
- Madhu school bus bombing (January 2008)
- Piliyandala bus bombing (April 2008)
- Moratuwa bus bombing (June 2008)

== Tunisia ==
- Tunis bombing (2015)

== United Kingdom ==
- Ballygawley bus bombing (1988)
- 1990 Wembley bombing (1990)
- Aldwych bus bombing (1996)
- Tavistock Square bus bombing (2005)

== Yemen ==
- Sadah bus bombing (2018)
