= Garissa University College attack =

2015 Al-Shabaab shooting in Kenya

2015 Garissa University College attack
- Location of Garissa Town in Kenya
- Location: 00°27′05″S 39°39′41″E; Garissa, Kenya
- Date: 2 April 2015; 05:30 (local time) (UTC+03:00)
- Target: Christian students
- Attack type: Hostage-taking, mass shooting, hate crime, terrorist attack
- Weapons: AK-47s and explosive belts
- Deaths: 148
- Injuries: 79
- Perpetrator: Al-Shabaab
- Motive: Kenyan participation in the AU Mission to Somalia, anti-Christian sentiment

On 2 April 2015, gunmen stormed the Garissa University College in Garissa, Kenya, killing 148 people, and injuring at least 79. The militant groups Al-Qaeda and Al-Shabaab, which the gunmen claimed to belong to, took responsibility for the attack. The gunmen took over 700 students hostage, freeing Muslims and killing those who identified as Christians. The siege ended the same day, when all four of the attackers were killed. Five men were later arrested in connection with the attack, and a bounty was placed for the arrest of a suspected organizer.

The attack was the deadliest in Kenya since the 1998 United States embassy bombings, and is the second deadliest overall, with more casualties than the 2002 Mombasa attacks, the 2013 Westgate shopping mall attack, the 2014 Nairobi bus bombings, the 2014 Gikomba bombings, the 2014 Mpeketoni attacks and the 2014 Lamu attacks. It is the deadliest mass shooting and school shooting in modern history.

== Background ==
Garissa, in the North Eastern Province around 200 km from the border with Somalia, was considered "one of the safest spots in the region." It housed both military barracks and police headquarters. Al-Shabaab, a multi-ethnic militant group based in Somalia with links to Al-Qaeda, had killed over 200 people in Kenya in the two years prior to the event, in attacks like the 2013 Westgate shopping mall shooting. These attacks significantly affected Kenya's tourism industry, although prior to Al-Shabaab's existence, the 2002 Mombasa attacks also targeted tourists. Previously, many of the militant group's attacks were outside major urban population centers.

Diplomats and analysts had also criticized the Kenyan security forces' policing strategy, which they described as heavy-handed and which involved indiscriminate mass arrests of resident Somalis. They further warned that such sweeping tactics would only result in creating resentment among Muslims, thereby providing Al-Shabaab with an opportunity to capitalize on the situation.

It was reported that there had been "high-profile warnings about a threat to a major university" prior to the attack. Grace Kai, a student at a nearby college, said that "strangers had been spotted in Garissa town and were suspected to be terrorists", and then "on Monday [30 March 2015] our college principal told us… that strangers had been spotted in our college"; on Tuesday, while the college closed and sent its students home, the university which remained open was attacked.

The attack came a day after the Kenyan President Uhuru Kenyatta had chastised the United Kingdom and Australia for renewing their travel warnings over security threats in Kenya, and accused them of perpetuating colonialism.

== Attack and hostage-taking ==
The attack started at around 05:30 am local time. Two unarmed guards were killed at the entrance. Twenty students were rescued by soldiers, including Collins Wetangula, who described the presence of at least five masked, armed gunmen, as well as Christians being "shot on the spot". Other survivors indicated that the shooters had summoned the pupils to get out of their bedrooms in the dormitory and to position themselves face-down on the ground, but then executed the students.

The Kenya Defence Forces and other security agencies were deployed. They surrounded and sealed off the university to flush out the gunmen, with the Interior Ministry and Kenya National Disaster Operation Centre reporting that three out of four dormitories had been evacuated. Michael Bwana, another student who fled, said that "most of the people still inside there are girls", in reference to the remaining student dormitory where the gunmen were believed to be hiding.

The siege ended after nearly 15 hours, with four gunmen killed just after dusk. The masked attackers wielded AK-47s and were strapped with explosives. Four of the terrorists were shot by the Recce Squad Commandos of the Kenyan GSU. The fifth terrorist was able to detonate his suicide vest causing injuries to some of the commandos.

Of the 148 dead, 142 were students, 3 were soldiers and 3 were police officers. Around 587 students escaped, but 79 were injured. Authorities said all students have since been accounted for.

== Perpetrators and motive ==
A student survivor said that the gunmen spoke in Swahili, and asserted that they were associated with the Al-Shabaab group. The group later claimed responsibility for the attack. A spokesman for the group, Sheikh Ali Mohamud Rage, said regarding the situation that "when our men arrived, they released the Muslims", but were holding Christians hostage. Rage also stated that his men's "mission is to kill those who are against the Shabab", and that "Kenya is at war with Somalia" in reference to the deployment of Kenyan troops in the African Union Mission to Somalia (AMISOM). Another spokesman asserted that Al-Shabaab attacked the institution because it was "on Muslim land colonized by non-Muslims".

One suspected attacker was arrested while fleeing the area during the siege. After the siege ended, two more suspected attackers were found on the campus and arrested, one of whom was Tanzanian and had no connections to the university.

British born Jihadist Samantha Lewthwaite was, at one point, believed by some to have masterminded the attack.

The Kenyan government named a citizen of Somali origin Mohamed Kuno (alias Sheikh Mohamed Dulayadayn, Gamadhere, or Mohamed Mohamud) as the mastermind behind the attack, and offered a KSh. 20,000,000/= (US$215,000) reward for his arrest. From 1993 to 1995, Mohamud had worked at the Al-Haramain Foundation, and later taught and became the principal of the Madrasa Najah school in Garissa until 2007 He later crossed into Somalia to join the Union of Islamic Courts and then Hizbul Islam, which merged with Al-Shabaab in 2010. The local media had associated Mohamud with two separate Al-Shabaab attacks in 2014 in the Mandera area.

On 4 April, Al-Shabaab issued a statement in English aimed at the Kenyan public. The emailed message denounced what it described as "unspeakable atrocities against the Muslims of East Africa" by Kenyan security forces, both in the predominantly ethnic Somali-inhabited North Eastern Province and in southern Somalia, where Kenyan forces had been deployed as part of AMISOM. The militant group indicated that the Garissa shooters wanted to "avenge the deaths of thousands of Muslims killed at the hands of the Kenyan security forces." In further retaliation, Al-Shabaab declared that "Kenyan cities will run red with blood" and vowed that it would "stop at nothing to avenge the deaths of our Muslim brothers until your government ceases its oppression and until all Muslim lands are liberated from Kenyan occupation." The group also warned the Kenyan public that it would target them in their workplaces, residences, schools and universities for "condoning your government's oppressive policies by failing to speak out against them" and for "reinforcing their policies by electing them."

On 4 April, the Interior Ministry of Kenya announced that five men suspected of involvement in the attack had been apprehended. Three of the individuals, Kenyan citizens of Somali origin, were believed to have been organizers. They were intercepted as they were attempting to enter Somalia. One of the men, Mohammed Abdirahim Abdullahi (aged 24), was reportedly the son of Bulla Jamhuri chief Abdullahi Daqare in Mandera County. The other individual was a security guard at the university; also a Kenyan citizen of Somali origin, he was thought to have facilitated entry into the institution. The last suspect, a Tanzanian named Rashid Charles Mberesero, was suspected of having been among the gunmen. He was reportedly found hiding in the ceiling and was carrying ammunition. Kenyan police were also searching for a close associate of Abdullahi's, who had received training with him in Somalia and later left for Yemen to reach Syria.

In June 2016, Mohamed Kuno, who led the attack was killed by regional forces in Somalia during a raid on a convoy in Kismayo, Somalia.

Mberesero, Mohamed Ali Abikar and Hassan Edin Hassan were charged with conspiracy to commit the attack and of belonging to Al-Shabaab. In June 2019, four years after the attack, they were found guilty, while Sahal Diriye Hussein, also charged, was acquitted.

On 15 November 2021, Ali Abikar escaped from prison with two other detained Al-Shabaab members, but were later apprehended in Kitui County in South Eastern Kenya as they attempted to cross to Somalia, three days later by Kenyan authorities following a tip-off from locals of the area.

== Reactions ==
The United Nations Security Council strongly condemned the attack in Garissa, stressing the need to bring to justice perpetrators, organizers, financiers and sponsors of what they termed as "reprehensible acts of terrorism", urging all states to cooperate with Kenyan authorities in the aftermath of the attack.

The United States, through its embassy in Nairobi, issued a statement strongly condemning the attack and extending condolences to all who were affected. President Barack Obama, who visited Kenya in July 2015, expressed horror and sadness at the reports that students were killed in the attack. He added that "the Kenyan people should know they have an unwavering friend and ally in the United States of America".

The British High Commission, which had issued an extended travel advisory covering Kenya at large, advised against all but essential travel to within 15 kilometres (9.3 mi) of the Coast Region. In the aftermath of the attack, the UK's Minister for Africa James Duddridge strongly condemned the attack, offering condolences to the families and loved ones of those who died.

Abdullahi Halakhe, a researcher with the Kenyan Amnesty International, suggested that the attack was not so much a reflection of Al-Shabaab's strength, but instead of the Kenyan government's incompetence. He also noted that the militant group was probably at its weakest point since 2006.

A Kenyan social media campaign on Twitter encouraged the use of the hashtag #147notjustanumber to humanize the victims, along with photos and names of those who had died in the attack. In an effort to make sure each student was honoured, a public Google document was also created.

== Aftermath ==
Nightly curfews from 18:30 to 6:30 were imposed until 16 April in Garissa and three other counties (Wajir, Mandera and Tana River) near the North Eastern Province's border with Somalia. The chairman of the Garissa Supreme Council of Kenya Muslims, Abdullahi Saalat, suggested that the Kenyan police were using the curfew as a pretext to harass residents, especially Muslims. He asserted that most Muslims had consequently chosen to remain in their houses. The coordinator for the Northern Forum for Democracy, Khalif Farah, likewise argued that the curfew would ultimately not help strengthen security because similar curfews that had been imposed in the past were ineffectual. He also suggested that the Kenya Police itself was the source of much of the insecurity, and indicated that rogue police officers had begun rounding up youth and were seeking bribes of 50/= and upwards for their release.

Defence Cabinet Secretary Raychelle Omamo announced that the government would cover the funeral expenses, and that the families of the victims would be given 100,000/=. Education CS Jacob Kaimenyi also indicated that the university had been closed indefinitely, and that the students who had survived the shooting did not wish to return.

The Kenyan authorities published a gazette notice listing Al-Shabaab and the Mombasa Republican Council separatist group as two of several terrorist organizations with operations in Kenya. The Central Bank of Kenya also reportedly suspended the licenses of 13 Somali-owned money transfer companies. An owner of one of these firms indicated that the companies were not suspended, but instead had had their licenses revoked without explanation. Additionally, the Kenyan government froze the bank accounts of 86 individuals and entities it alleged were associated with Al-Shabaab. The Kenyan government also called for the closure of the nearby Dadaab refugee camps, for fear that Al-Shabaab was using it as recruiting grounds for new members. Their initial three month ultimatum was later relaxed, and the repatriation of refugees is currently voluntary, not enforced.

Former Prime Minister of Kenya Raila Odinga, former Kenyan Minister of Trade Moses Wetangula, and other members of the Coalition for Reforms and Democracy (CORD) called for an immediate withdrawal of Kenyan troops from Somalia. Wetangula also recommended that the Kenyan government cut its military budget in half, and reallocate the slashed funds toward strengthening internal security. Additionally, Odinga accused Kenyan President Uhuru Kenyatta of conceitedness for having dismissed intelligence alerts of potential attacks issued by foreign nations.

Ten days after the shootings, an explosion of a power transformer outside the student hostel at the University of Nairobi Kikuyu Campus sent pupils panicking in fear of another attack. Some students jumped out of windows, and the ensuing stampede left one student dead as he jumped from the 5th floor of the Kimberly hostel. Around 150 pupils sustained minor injuries, and 20 individuals received treatment at the hospital. It was later established that the blast had been caused by an ordinary electrical fault.

Over the following weeks, 96 of the 150 primary and secondary schools in Garissa County closed over security fears, as many teachers have refused to return to work. Primary schools have been particularly badly affected by these closures.

In 2019, three Islamist militants, Kenyan citizens Mohammed Ali Abikar and Hassan Edin Hassan and Tanzanian citizen Rashid Charles Mberesero, were convicted for their role in the attack. Abikar and Hassan received 41-year prison sentences while Mberesero was sentenced to life in prison. On 27 November 2020, Rashid Charles Mberesero committed suicide at Kenya's highest security prison. In November 2021, Abikar along with two other terrorists escaped from Kenya's highest security Prison Kamiti. They were later rearrested.

== See also ==
- Garissa Massacre
- List of hostage crises
- List of Islamist terrorist attacks
- Terrorism in Kenya
