= May 2015 Garissa ambush =

Attack by Al-Shabaab in Kenya

On 26 May 2015, Kenyan police were ambushed by Al-Shabaab in Garissa County, which borders with Somalia.

The attack comes amid intensifying Islamist militancy in the county, which was the scene of the Garissa University College attack in April 2015.

== Background ==
Since late 2011, Kenya has seen an upsurge in violent terrorist attacks. Kenyan government officials asserted that many of the murders and blasts were carried out by Al-Shabaab in retaliation for Operation Linda Nchi, a coordinated military mission between the Somali military and Kenyan military that began in October 2011, when troops from Kenya crossed the border into the conflict zones of southern Somalia. The Kenyan government has deployed its forces under the wider African Union Mission to Somalia, and announced in March 2012 that it would be sending 5,000 troops to join the coalition.

Since the Operation Linda Nchi began, Al-Shabaab vowed retaliation against the Kenyan authorities. At the militant group's urging, a significant and increasing number of terrorist attacks in Kenya have since been carried out by local Kenyans, many of whom are recent converts to Islam. Estimates in 2014 placed the figure of Kenyan fighters at around 25% of Al-Shabaab's total forces.

By mid-2014, the cumulative attacks began affecting Kenya's tourism industry, as Western nations issued travel warnings to their citizens.

== See also ==
- 2010 Kenya–Al-Shabaab border clash
- 2011–14 terrorist attacks in Kenya
- Garissa University College attack
- Terrorism in Kenya
- Operation Indian Ocean
- Somali Civil War (2009–present)
