= List of massacres in Kenya =

The following is a list of massacres in Kenya and its predecessor polities (numbers may be approximate).

| Name | Date | Location | Deaths | Notes |
British Administration
| Sotik Massacre | 1905 | Sotik | Est. 900 to 1,850 | Kipsigis from the Talai Clan were massacred, in an act of collective punishment, by a colonial force dispatched from the British administration in Kenya. A punitive expedition, under the commanded of Major Pope-Hennessey, having been sanctioned and dispatched in response to the Kipsigis community refusing to surrender Masai women, children, and heads of cattle, stolen in raids on the Masai reserve in modern-day Narok County. In 2018, Kericho County, through Governor Paul Chepkwony, successfully lodged a complaint with a UN special rapporteur in Geneva, asking the British government to compensate for the massacre and subsequent displacement of the Kipsigis during the colonial era. |
| Kitale massacre | 12 May 1929 | Kitale | 12 | A tenant farmer, Mogo, killed 12 people, including his wife and daughter, after being accused of being a Wizard. He was later captured, tried, and hanged for murder. |
| Ruck Family massacre | January 1953 | Great Rift Valley | 4 | The Ruck family, and a worker were massacred by Mau Mau supporters. |
| Lari massacre | 26 March 1953 | Lari | Est. 97 to 200 | Kikuyu Loyalists, and their families were attacked by Mau Mau supporters. |
| Chuka massacre | June 1953 | Chuka, Eastern Province | 2 Mau Mau captives, 10 Loyalist Home guard, 11 civilians, including one child | Soldiers from the 'B' Company of the 5th King's African Rifles, killed members of a Loyalist Home-guard unit, notionally helping them flush out Mau Mau rebels from a forest, and the day after 11 loyalist villagers, while their commanding officer, a Major G. S. L. Griffiths tortured and killed the second of two Mau Mau prisoners. Griffiths would later face Court-martial, and be convicted of murder, but not his subordinates. The families of the 21 dead loyalists would be compensated. |
| Hola massacre | 3 March 1959 | Hola | 11 | A number of Mau Mau prisoners, in a work party of 85, refused to work and were beaten, 11 died of their injuries, a further 23 required medical treatment. |
Republic of Kenya
| Isiolo massacre | 1960s | Isiolo District | 2,700+ | Over 2,700 Killed During 1960s Isiolo Massacre. Civilians of the Kenyan Somali community were murdered by the Kenyan security personnel of the then President Jomo Kenyatta, including the Isiolo Mosque Massacre of 18 elders of the Kenyan Somali community in 1967 during prayer time at around noon. The Kenyan Government was responding to the shifta insurgency and they shot all the men they found. During the state of emergency in 1960s, most of the young Kenyan Somali men left the province due to the injustices and killings. The victims estimate the number of those shot dead during the state of emergency, when thousands of pastoralists were put into three concentration camps at 2,700. |
| Kisumu massacre | 1969 | Kisumu | Over 100 deaths | Several civilians were murdered by security personnel of the then President Jomo Kenyatta. The casualties included school children who were to perform for the president and innocent traders from a nearby market. |
| Garissa massacre | 1980 | Garissa, North Eastern Province | 300-over 3,000 deaths | The Garissa Massacre was a 1980 massacre of ethnic Somali residents by the Kenyan government in the Garissa District of the North Eastern Province, Kenya. The incident occurred when Kenyan government forces, acting on the premise of flushing out a local gangster known as Abdi Madobe, set fire to a residential village called Bulla Kartasi, killing people and raping women. They then forcefully interned the populace at Garissa Primary School football pitch for three days without water or food, resulting in over 3000 deaths. Residents apart from Somalis were given permission to leave the school pitch unharmed. The government of Somalia, then led by the Supreme Revolutionary Council, intervened by threatening that if such brutalities did not cease, the Somali military would overthrow the Nairobi regime and occupy the country. Consequently, the Kenyan government lifted the curfew and released the detained individuals unconditionally. |
| Wagalla massacre | 10 February 1984 | Wajir District, North Eastern Province | 475,2,000,5,000 | The Wagalla massacre was a massacre of ethnic Somalis by Kenyan security forces on 10 February 1984 in Wajir County, Kenya. The Wagalla massacre took place on 10 February 1984 at the Wagalla Airstrip. The facility is situated approximately 15 km (9 mi) west of the county capital of Wajir in the North Eastern Province, a region primarily inhabited by ethnic Somalis. Kenyan troops had descended on the area to reportedly help diffuse clan-related conflict. However, according to eye-witness testimony, about 5,000 Somali men were then taken to an airstrip and prevented from accessing water and food for five days before being executed by Kenyan soldiers.[1] According to a commissioner with the Truth, Justice and Reconciliation Commission of Kenya, a government oversight body that had been formed in response to the 2008 Kenyan post-election violence, the Wagalla massacre represents the worst human rights violation in Kenya's history. |
| St.Kizito massacre | 13 July 1991 | Akithii Location, Meru County | 19 | |
| Kyanguli Fire Tragedy | 24 March 2001 | Machakos County | 67 | Two students set fire to a dormitory at Kyanguli Secondary School located in Machakos, 30 miles (48 km) southeast of Nairobi, after the final exam results were annulled and payment of their outstanding school fees was demanded. 67 people perished in the flames and another 19 were injured, including one of the perpetrators. |
| 2002 Mombasa attacks | 28 November 2002 | Mombasa | 13 | al-Qaeda carried out a series of terrorist acts against Israeli targets in the city of Mombasa. |
| Turbi massacre | 12 July 2005 | near Marsabit | 60 | 22 were children |
| Kiambaa church massacre | 1 January 2008 | Eldoret, Uasin Gishu County | 35+ | Kalenjin mob set a church on fire with 200 Kikuyu civilians sheltering inside it during the 2007–2008 Kenyan crisis. |
| Mathira massacre | 21 April 2009 | Karatina | 29+ | |
| 2012 Tana River District clashes | 22 August 2012 | Tana River District | 52 | Ethnic-communal clashes between Orma and Pokomo people |
| Westgate shopping mall attack | 21–24 September 2013 | Westlands, Nairobi | 71 | Al-Shabaab militants attack a shopping mall in Nairobi with small arms and grenades. |
| Garissa University College massacre | 2 April 2015 | Garissa, North Eastern Province | 148 | |
| Nairobi DusitD2 complex attack | 15–16 January 2019 | Westlands, Nairobi | 27 | Al-Shabaab militants attack an upscale hotel in Nairobi with small arms and explosives |
| Shakahola Forest incident | March 2023 | Shakahola village, near Malindi | 429 | |
| Githurai Massacre | June 25 2024 | Githurai 45 in Nairobi on Thika street | 30+ | KDF forces opened fire on anti-finance bill 2024.(Unconfirmed) |
