= 2019 Kenya bus shooting =

Terrorist attack in Kenya

- Part of Somali–Kenyan conflict
- Location: Wargadadud and Kutulu, Wajir County, Kenya
- Date: 6 December 2019
- Weapon: Guns
- Deaths: 11
- Injuries: 4
- Perpetrator: Al-Shabaab

On 6 December 2019, at least 11 people, including seven police officers, were shot dead on or outside a bus in Kenya. The Medina Bus Company vehicle and its passengers were attacked on a road in a rural area between Wajir and Mandera in northeastern Kenya. Al-Shabaab claimed responsibility for the attack.

== Background ==
The Islamist militant group Al-Shabaab has been opposed to Kenyan involvement in the Somali Civil War. The terrorist group has previously attacked the suburb of Westlands during the 2013 Westgate shopping mall attack, which left 67 people dead. In 2015, Al-Shabaab terrorists were involved in mass shooting of Garissa University College students leaving 147 dead and many others injured. In 2019 two attacks occurred in the same month of each other, including the attack on January 15, 2019, an attack on a hotel in Nairobi which killed 21 individuals. The second attack happened in less than two weeks near a Kenya Cinema bus stop which injured two individuals.

== Attack ==
Gunmen associated with Al-Shabaab killed 11 people including seven Kenya Police officers on a bus traveling through Wargadadud and Kutulu in Wajir, Kenya.
