= 1980 Nairobi hotel bombing =

Bombing in Nairobi, Kenya

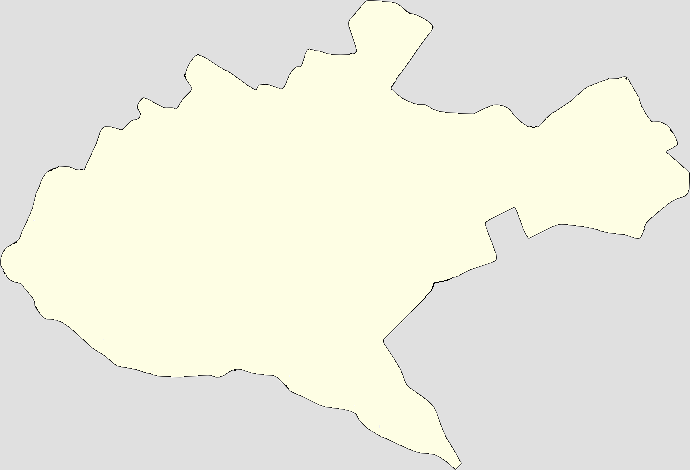
- The attack site in Nairobi, Kenya
- Location: 1.278295°S 36.815795°E; Fairmont The Norfolk Hotel, Nairobi, Kenya
- Date: 31 December 1980; 45 years ago
- Attack type: Bombing, terrorist attack
- Deaths: 20
- Injuries: 87
- Assailant: Qaddura Mohammed Abd Al-Hamid

On 31 December 1980, New Year's Eve, a bomb exploded in The Norfolk Hotel in Nairobi, Kenya. It partially destroyed the hotel, killing 20 people and wounding another 87.

The owner of the hotel was a prominent member of the local Jewish community, and it has been suggested that the attack was in retaliation for Kenya providing support to rescue the Israeli hostages in Uganda during Operation Entebbe four years earlier. Among the dead were at least four Kenyans, two Americans, two British children, a Danish employee of KLM, a Frenchman, and a Belgian child. The bomber was said by the Kenyan government to be a Moroccan with a Maltese passport named Qaddura Mohammed Abd Al-Hamid, identified as a member of the Popular Front for the Liberation of Palestine (PFLP) who departed on a flight to Saudi Arabia on the day of the bombing.

== See also ==
- 2002 Mombasa attacks
