= Lake Kenyatta =

Kenyan physical feature

- Lake Mukunganya
- Location within Kenya Location within Africa
- Coordinates: 02°24′45″S 40°40′53″E
- Lake type: Fresh water
- Primary outflows: Evaporation
- Basin countries: Kenya
- Max. length: 12 kilometres (7 mi)
- Surface elevation: 10 m (33 ft)
- Settlements: Mpeketoni

Lake Kenyatta, also Lake Mukunganya, is a lake in Lamu County, in southeastern Kenya.

== Location ==
The lake is located in Lamu County, approximately 2.5 kilometres (2 mi), southwest of the town of Mpeketoni. (est. pop. 50,000 in 2015). This is approximately 50 kilometres (31 mi), by road, southwest of the port city of Lamu. The coordinates of the lake are: 2°24'45.0"S, 40°40'53.0"E (Latitude:-2.412494; Longitude:40.681396).

== Fauna ==
The lake supports herds of hippopotami, zebra, monkeys, waterbuck, buffalo and warthog. Also, a large number of wild birds are found here.

== Silting ==
Due to encroachment from the rapidly increasing population in Mpeketoni, the lake is shrinking as a result of (a) silting (b) humans invading its wetlands (c) drilling of many boreholes in the catchment area and (d) invasion by large herds of domestic cattle.

== See also ==
- Rift Valley lakes
- List of rivers of Kenya
- Mpeketoni
