= 2022 Mandera attack =

Murders in Mandera County, Kenya on 31 January 2022

- Part of Somali Civil War (2009-present)
- Location: Hagarsu, Mandera County, Kenya
- Date: 31 January 2022
- Deaths: 10
- Injuries: 13
- Perpetrator: al-Shabaab

On 31 January 2022, al-Shabaab attacked a bus carrying civilians in Mandera County, Kenya, near the border with Somalia. Ten people were killed, and thirteen injured, in the attack.

== Background ==
The Somali government has been fighting the jihadist group al-Shabaab since 2009, in the Somali Civil War. Due to a lack of security along the Kenyan-Somali border, al-Shabaab militants often launch raids into rural Kenyan counties, like Wajir County, Lamu County, and Mandera County. In 2019, al-Shabaab attacked a bus in Wajir county that was carrying law enforcement, killing eleven people. The road attacked in January 2022 had also been attacked before in 2015, killing three people but failing to assassinate the Mandera County governor. Another attack hit the road in 2021. Prior to the January 2022 attack, French, American, and Dutch officials warned Kenyan security that attacks were likely, but Kenya stated that they had no knowledge of these.

== Attack ==
At the time of the attack, the bus was traveling through the town of Hagarsu, along the E87 highway. Around 20 people were on the bus at the time of the explosion. Witnesses stated gunshots rang out, and then the bus hit an IED on the road, which was suspected to have been placed there earlier that week by al-Shabaab. Survivors stated that following the bombing, al-Shabaab militants attacked the bus and shot people, injuring and killing several. A police report later claimed the attackers fled back towards the Somali border. Two other vehicles behind the destroyed one were unaffected by the attack.

Initial reports from Kenyan media stated six people were killed, which rose to a number between seven and thirteen as injuries were still being assessed. Hospitals in the area stated that they were treating 13 people for injuries. Ten people were killed in total, with thirteen injured.

== Aftermath ==
The Honorary Consulate of Kenya to Ukraine expressed their condolences. The Mandera County Deputy Governor Mohamed Arai called on security agencies to fully investigate the bombing. In an interview with Hiiraan Online, Rono Bunei, the North Eastern police commander, stated that the attackers had warned the bus driver by placing a sign, and that the driver had likely not seen it.

Days later, on February 2, four people were killed in an al-Shabaab planted IED in Wajir County.
