= Isiolo massacre =

Massacre of ethnic Somali by Kenyan security

Isiolo massacre
- Location: 00°21′N 37°35′E; Isiolo, Isiolo County, Kenya
- Date: 1960s
- Attack type: Massacre
- Deaths: 2,700+

The Isiolo Massacre refers collectively to a series of massacres of ethnic Somalis by Kenyan security personnel in the 1960s in Isiolo County, Kenya.

== Massacre ==
During the Shifta War in the 1960s, civilians of the Kenyan Somali community were murdered by government soldiers, including the 1967 killing of 18 elders in the Isiolo Mosque during prayer time at around noon. There were an estimated 2,700 Somali Kenyans killed in Isiolo County at the hand of Kenyan security forces.

== See also ==
- Garissa massacre
- Wagalla massacre
