= Ruck Family massacre =

Incident in the Mau Mau Uprising in Kenya

Ruck Family Massacre
- Part of Mau Mau Uprising
- North Kinangop (Kenya)
- Operational scope: Terrorist attack
- Location: North Kinangop, Naivasha District, Kenya Colony
- Planned by: Mau Mau Leadership
- Target: Ruck Family
- Objective: Murder of the Ruck Family
- Date: 24 January 1953
- Executed by: Mau Mau
- Outcome: Ruck family were murdered
- Casualties: 4 killed (3 Ruck family members, 1 African servant)

The Ruck Family massacre took place during the Mau Mau Uprising. Farmer Roger Ruck, his wife Esme and six-year-old son Michael, along with one of their African servants, were killed by Mau Mau, one of whom allegedly worked for the family. The killing shocked the European community in Kenya and was widely reported in the Kenyan and British press, with many including graphic photographs of the dead child. The incident was significant in radicalising the settler population. Within 48 hours of the killings, 1,500 European settlers marched on Government House, demanding action from then Governor of Kenya Evelyn Baring.

The massacre was fictionalised in the novel Something of Value by Robert Ruark, and in the 1957 film version.
