= 2011–2014 terrorist attacks in Kenya =

From late 2011 to 2014, Kenya experienced an upsurge in violent terrorist attacks. Kenyan government officials asserted that many of the murders and blasts were carried out by al-Shabaab in retaliation for Operation Linda Nchi, a coordinated military mission between the Somali military and Kenyan military that began in October 2011, when troops from Kenya crossed the border into the conflict zones of southern Somalia. According to Kenyan security experts, the bulk of the attacks were increasingly carried out by radicalized Kenyan youth who were hired for the purpose. Kenya security officials also indicated that they were part of death squads, which carried out many of the killings under the orders of a government security council. By mid-2014, the cumulative attacks began affecting Kenya's tourism industry, as Western nations issued travel warnings to their citizens.

== Background ==
Since the Operation Linda Nchi began, Al-Shabaab vowed retaliation against the Kenyan authorities. At the militant group's urging, a significant and increasing number of terrorist attacks in Kenya have since been carried out by local Kenyans, many of whom are recent converts to Islam. Estimates in 2014 placed the figure of Kenyan fighters at around 25% of Al-Shabaab's total forces. Referred to as the "Kenyan Mujahideen" by Al-Shabaab's core members, the converts are typically young and overzealous, poverty making them easier targets for the outfit's recruitment activities. Because the Kenyan insurgents have a different profile from the Somali and Arab militants that allows them to blend in with the general population of Kenya, they are also often harder to track. Reports suggest that Al-Shabaab is attempting to build an even more multi-ethnic generation of fighters in the larger region. One such recent convert who helped carry out the Kampala bombings but now cooperates with the Kenyan police believes that in doing so, the group is essentially trying to use local Kenyans to do its "dirty work" for it while its core members escape unscathed. According to diplomats, Muslim areas in coastal Kenya and Tanzania, such as Mombasa and Zanzibar, are also especially vulnerable for recruitment.

In December 2014, Kenyan Anti-Terrorism Police Unit officers confessed to Al-Jazeera that they were responsible for almost 500 of the extrajudicial killings. The murders reportedly totaled several hundred homicides every year. They included the assassination of Abubaker Shariff Ahmed "Makaburi", an Al-Shabaab associate from Kenya, who was among 21 Muslim radicals allegedly murdered by the Kenyan police since 2012. According to the agents, they resorted to killing after the Kenyan police could not successfully prosecute terror suspects. In doing so, the officers indicated that they were acting on the direct orders of Kenya's National Security Council, which consisted of the Kenyan President, Deputy President, Chief of the Defence Forces, Inspector General of Police, National Security Intelligence Service Director, Cabinet Secretary of Interior, and Principal Secretary of Interior. Kenyan President Uhuru Kenyatta and the National Security Council of Kenya members denied operating an extrajudicial assassination program. Additionally, the officers suggested that Western security agencies provided intelligence for the program, including the whereabouts and activities of government targets. They asserted that Britain supplied further logistics in the form of equipment and training. One Kenyan officer within the council's General Service Unit also indicated that Israeli instructors taught them how to kill. The head of the International Bar Association, Mark Ellis, cautioned that any such involvement by foreign nations would constitute a breach of international law. The United Kingdom and Israel denied participation in the Kenyan National Security Council's reported death squads, with the UK Foreign Office indicating that it had approached the Kenyan authorities over the charges.

By May 2014, the United States, United Kingdom, France and Australia began issuing travel warnings to their citizens in Kenya. This had an immediate impact on Kenya's tourism industry, as European visitors left the country and hotel establishments were consequently forced to lay off staff. The U.S. also reduced its staff levels at its Nairobi embassy. In June 2014, the U.K. likewise shut down its Honorary Consulate in Mombasa over security concerns.

== Timeline ==
=== 2011 ===
The first attack by al-Shabaab was on a blue-collar bar known as Mwaura's in downtown Mfangano Street in Nairobi on Monday, 24 October 2011, at around 1:15 am. The hurled grenade left one person dead and wounded more than 20. Police said that the weapon used was a Russian-made F1 grenade.

A second blast occurred later the same day, when a grenade was tossed out of a moving vehicle into the Machakos bus terminus. 59 men and ten women were subsequently hospitalised, of which two were in intensive care and five people were confirmed dead.

The attacks came only two days after the United States warned of "imminent" terror attacks. The US warning had implied that al-Shabaab would carry out reprisals in response to Kenyan troops' incursion into Somalia in mid-October. Elgiva Bwire Oliacha, a recent Kenyan Muslim convert, was arrested in connection with the two blasts and was sentenced to life in prison after having pleaded guilty to all charges.

Al-Shabaab was suspected of carrying out a few more attacks in October as well. In November 2011, Al-Shabaab attacked several other locations including the East African Pentecostal Church, a military convoy, and a Holiday Inn hotel. The militant group is suspected of carrying out nine attacks in Kenya in December 2011; some of the attacks resulted in injuries and casualties while some resulted in no injuries.

=== 2012 ===
==== January – June ====
Militants were responsible for several attacks over the first few months of 2012. In January, there were three reported attacks, including the killing of the chairperson of the Community Peace and Security Team in Hagadera camp as well as several police officers. It was also reported that Kenyan police seized explosive equipment in an Ifo camp in the Dadaab complex, arresting nine suspects. In February, Al-Shabaab claimed responsibility for an attack that resulted in the death of a police officer and a civilian while injuring two other civilians. On 10 March 2012, six were killed and over sixty were injured after four grenades were thrown into a Machakos bus station in Nairobi.

On Sunday, 29 April 2012, around 8:50am, an attack took place at God's House of Miracles Church at Ngara Estate in Nairobi. As reported by one of the dailies, an attacker, who goes by the name Amar, entered the church and left. He later came back and took a seat in the back, hurling the grenade at worshipers while they had been called by the pastor to the pulpit. The experts said that the grenade used had been made in China.

One person died and 11 people were admitted at Kenyatta National Hospital.

On Tuesday, 15 May, three hand grenades were hurled at the Bella Vista nightclub in Mombasa, Kenya, killing one and leaving five others injured. The attacker also fired indiscriminately after he was denied entry into the Bella Vista club. A woman died as a result of a gunshot to the chest the two guards were injured. A suspect who had sustained injuries in the attack was arrested in connection to the assault. A bus ticket to Nairobi was recovered from the suspect and a magazine loaded with eight rounds of ammunition. Police arrested a suspect Mr. Thabit Jamaldin Yahya. He is still in remand.

On Monday, 28 May, a blast went off from inside the Sasa Boutique located within Assanand's House on Nairobi's Moi Avenue. 27 people were injured in the blast, and it was reported that four were in critical condition. Police Commissioner Mathew Iteere said that the explosion was the result of either a grenade or a bomb. Over the course of four other May attacks, one police officer was killed and numerous others were injured.

On Sunday, 24 June at around 10 pm EAT, another grenade attack was reported at a Jericho Beer Garden in Mishomoroni, Kisauni Constituency in Mombasa, Kenya. The bar was packed with patrons who had gathered to watch the UEFA European Championships 2012 football match between England and Italy. The grenade killed one person on the spot while two more died due to injuries while they were receiving treatment at the Coast general hospital. 30 more were injured, including a suspect who was alleged to be part of the attackers, a 9-year-old boy.

This attack happened on the same day the Kenyan Navy had taken away two explosive devices that had been found floating in the Indian Ocean. The US government (through its embassy in Kenya) had issued a warning to its citizens to leave the coastal city of Mombasa due to a possible imminent attack. Athman Salim, a 23-year-old Kenyan day labourer from the Kilifi District was the main suspect of the attack. Although a Muslim, Athman denied any involvement with extremist groups or having ever journeyed to Somalia. He claimed that he had visited the pub to listen some local music, and indicated that he had never worked outside the city of Mombasa. He was released on 9 July after spending 10 days in Nyali police station.

==== July – December ====
On 1 July at around 10:15 am EAT, masked gunmen attacked two churches (the Central Catholic Cathedral and AIC churches) simultaneously in Garissa, located approximately 140 kilometres from the Somali border. The assailants killed seventeen people and left fifty injured. The churches are 3 kilometres apart and the dead included two police officers, four men, nine women and two children. The North Eastern Police Provincial Officer (PPO) Philip Ndolo reported that the gunmen attacked the two policemen first and took their firearms before they proceeded to attack the churches. The attackers used pistols to shoot the policemen at point blank range and then snatched their G3 rifles which were later used to shoot at the AIC church worshipers indiscriminately. No shooting was reported at the Catholic's Central Cathedral but a hand grenade was set off, resulting in less casualties than the AIC attack. The Supreme Muslim Council (SUPKEM) in Kenya warned of a misinterpretation of this attack as a religious war against the Christians. A joint effort by the Kenya Police, Administration Police, National Security Intelligence Service and the paramilitary General Service Unit saw the arrest of 83 suspects in connection with the attack during a massive security swoop after the attack.

Four people were reported injured on 18 July when two hand grenades went off at a barbershop in Wajir. In addition, three police officers were injured on 25 July when their patrol hit a landmine.

Police also arrested a man who was carrying two grenades at the Nakuru Agricultural Show shortly before President Mwai Kibaki arrived to deliver a speech. It was also reported that they arrested two men with four hand grenades in Kitale as they were boarding a Nairobi-bound bus; a third man escaped capture.

On the evening of 3 August, one person was killed and six more were left injured at the Eastleigh neighbourhood near the Kenya Airforce headquarters in Nairobi. The attack came on the eve of a visit by Hillary Clinton, the United States secretary of state. The suicide bombing was inadvertently carried out by an innocent carrier of the detonated home-made device. The attackers have adopted a new way of executing their plans by giving unsuspecting citizens armed home-made explosives that they in turn detonate remotely at a safe distance. The attackers have been using ordinary home equipment like the transistor radios and gas cylinders in their new methods. This attack on 3 August blew the upper torso of the carrier of the transistor radio which contained the explosive. On 28 August, three Kenyan policeman are killed and over a dozen wounded in a grenade attack during riots in the port city of Mombasa over the killing of Islamist cleric Aboud Rogo Mohammed.

On 30 September, at around 10:30am, a 9-year-old boy was killed when a grenade was hurled towards Sunday school children at St Polycarp Anglican Church along Juja road in Nairobi. On 21 September, four police officers and three civilians were injured during a series of two explosions. The first explosion targeted a GSU lorry and the secondary explosion went off when officers rushed to the scene.

There were several attacks on Administration Police officers in September. On 30 September, two police officers were shot dead from behind while patrolling along Ngamia road in Garissa. Additionally, on 15 September, two Administration Police officers were injured in an explosion when their vehicle hit a landmine.

On 27 October, CID officer Yussuf Yero was shot and killed in a Hagdera, Daadab mosque as he read the Koran.

On 20 November, Kenya Defence Forces were involved in an operation in Garissa, where KDF soldiers subsequently burned down the local market and shot at a crowd of protesters, killing a woman and injuring 10 people. Another 35 residents received treatment at the provincial hospital after being assaulted by the soldiers, including a chief and two pupils. A group of MPs led by Farah Maalim, accused Kenyan officers of fomenting violence, raping women and shooting at students, and threatened to take the matter to the International Court of Justice (ICJ), if the perpetrators are not brought to justice. Maalim also suggested that the deployment of the soldiers was unconstitutional and had not received the requisite parliamentary approval, and that the ensuing rampage cost Garissa entrepreneurs over Sh1.5 billion to Sh2billion in missed revenue. Additionally, Sheikhs with the CPK threatened to sue the military commanders for crimes against humanity committed during the operation. CJPC Bishops also urged Kenyans to resist engaging in violence, and instead to report offences to the relevant authorities.

Additionally, several police officers were killed and injured as attacks escalated. It was reported that on 11 November at least 38 police officers are killed by cattle rustlers in the northern part of the country. On 1 November, a policeman was on shot dead and another seriously injured on by assailants in Garissa town. The officers were on patrol when they were ambushed by four men, one of whom was a teenager. On 4 November, a policeman has been killed and 10 people were injured in a grenade attack on a church in Kenya.

On Sunday, 18 November, ten people were killed and 25 seriously injured when an explosive went off on a mass transit mini-bus (matatu) in Eastleigh. The explosion is believed to be an improvised explosive device or bomb of some sort. Looting and destruction of Somali-owned homes and shops by angry mobs of young Kenyans ensues. Somalis defend their property, and interpret the bus explosion as a pretext for non-Somalis to steal from their community. Relative calm reportedly returns by mid-afternoon.

On Wednesday, 5 December, around 7pm, an explosion went off in the Joska area of Eastleigh, Nairobi, killing one person and wounding six others. The explosion that occurred during rush hour traffic was caused by a roadside bomb, and was not far from the site of a blast a few weeks earlier.

On Friday, 7 December, around 7:30pm, five people were killed and eight others injured in an explosion near a mosque in the Eastleigh area of Nairobi. The wounded included the area member of parliament Abdi Yusuf Hassan. A second attack was carried out at the same mosque on 16 December, seriously injuring one person.

On 19 December, two people were injured after two blasts went off outside Al Amin mosque in Eastleigh area of Nairobi. The blasts took place during rush hour Suspected Al-shabab militants shot three people dead and injured one person on Kenyatta Street in Garissa on 20 December at 7 pm. The dead included a banker and a civil servant. On 27 December, at 11 pm a police officer was shot dead while his colleague escaped unharmed after being attacked by suspected Islamists in Mandera town. The assailants also stole a G3 rifle from the two constables.

=== 2013 ===
On 4 January, at 7 pm, two people were killed and seven wounded in a grenade attack at Dagahale area in Garissa. The grenade was hurled from a saloon car at a tent where people were chewing khat.

A grenade was thrown into a police vehicle as it drove past a crowd along Ngamia road near the local District Officer's (DO) office on 7 January 2013. Four people including three police officers were seriously wounded in a grenade attack on a police car in Garissa town. On 8 January, one of the wounded, a 22-year-old man, succumbed to injuries. The number of wounded admitted in hospital was confirmed as eight people including four police officers.

On the evening of 9 January, two grenades were thrown into the World Food Programme (WFP) compound in Mandera Town. There were no injuries reported. The blast occurred as a group of worshipers was leaving a nearby mosque after their prayers.

On 16 January, suspected Islamic militants shot dead five people and injured three others at a restaurant in the eastern city of Garissa. Authorities said they believed the gunmen belonged to the Al-Shabaab group, as the victims included a senior prison warden, fitting a pattern of attacks against security forces.

Two men believed to be suicide bombers of Somali origin died on the morning of 17 January 2013 after improvised explosive devices (IEDs) had gone off in Hagdera refugee camp in Dadaab.

On 31 January, a blast injured three Kenyan policemen during the evening in the Dagahalley area of the northern town of Dadaab. The explosion had targeted a police vehicle. Police had earlier in the evening recovered two hand grenades.

On 2 February, a KDF soldier was killed in a blast in Wajir after a terrorist who appeared to know him hurled a grenade at the man and his girlfriend. The officer was among several people on a break from the coordinated Linda Nchi operation in southern Somalia between the Somali military and Kenyan forces against the Al-Shabaab insurgents. Two other policemen were wounded in the explosion, while the woman had injuries to her legs.

On 5 February, an administration police sergeant was assassinated in Garissa. He had just arrived in the town from his habitual station in Dadaab when one of several gunmen shot him in the head. The assailants escaped the scene by foot, with police making no arrests.

On the evening of 18 April, four armed men walked into the Kwa Chege Hotel in Garissa and started shooting. At least six people were shot dead and ten others seriously wounded.

On 9 June, nearly simultaneous evening attacks in Eastleigh (Nairobi) and Likoni (Mombasa) left at least 15 people injured.

==== Westgate shopping mall attack ====
On 21 September 2013, armed gunmen attacked the Westgate Shopping Mall in Nairobi, killing at least 69 people and injuring more than 175. The President Uhuru Kenyatta reportedly lost "very close family members" in the attack. Hundreds of people were evacuated from the mall. The attack was thought to be orchestrated by extremists against non-Muslim Kenyans and Westerners in the area.

On 13 December 2013, double blasts in the northeastern town of Wajir killed one individual and wounded at least three other people.

==== Eastleigh bus attack ====
On 14 December 2013 at about 6 pm, a hand grenade was thrown onto a 32-seat matatu minibus driving near Pangani Girls School in Eastleigh, a Somali-dominated suburb in Nairobi, the capital of Kenya. No group claimed responsibility for the attack, which killed six people and wounded 36 others, who were brought to three hospitals. An attacker was among the dead. The bus was destroyed and several nearby cars were damaged.

Interior minister Mutea Iringo condemned the attack on Twitter, and said it would not be tolerated, seeking information from the public. It was the fourth such attack to occur during the 50th anniversary week of Kenya's independence, with no group claiming responsibility for the assaults. It came three months after the Westgate shopping mall attack, which left 67 dead, not including the gunmen. The attack was also similar to those perpetrated by al Shabaab. Police shut down the street and implicated the group or a matatu rivalry.

A foreigner was arrested in connection with the attack near the scene and was being questioned. The attack prompted the Kenyan National Transport and Safety Authority to begin a program to train bus drivers in counter-terrorism practices.

=== 2014 ===
On 14 March 2014, in the Kenyan city of Mombasa, two terrorists were arrested while driving a car carrying two improvised bombs.

On 19 March 2014, Kenyan police unintentionally parked a car outside their office that was carrying a massive cache of terrorist explosives, including 130 pounds of plastic.

On 31 March 2014, a pair of explosions killed six people in Eastleigh. Occurring along 11th street around 7:30pm, one of the blasts took place near a food kiosk; the other near a bus stop.

On 1 April 2014, in the Eastleigh district of Nairobi, six people were killed and dozens more injured when terrorists exploded bombs at two separate locations about three hundred meters apart.

On 9 April 2014, it was reported that twelve shops in the Nairobi city center were being investigated for funneling money to terrorists.

On 23 April 2014, a car exploded at the Pangani police station in Nairobi, killing the four occupants: the driver, a passenger, and two police officers who had boarded the vehicle to guide it to the police station. A second vehicle with explosives was subsequently found abandoned just blocks away.

On 3 May 2014, twin terrorist attacks in the port city of Mombasa killed three people.

On 4 May 2014, on the Thika Highway in Nairobi, terrorists exploded homemade bombs on two commuter buses, nearly simultaneously and about a kilometer apart. According to the report, at least three people were killed and at least sixty-two others injured. The 45-seater buses were "packed with commuters", two bombs exploded on different buses around 1 kilometre (0.62 mi) apart. The explosions occurred outside Safari Park hotel, and in an underpass next To TRM Mall. According to Kenya's National Disaster Operations Centre, twenty of the injured people were in a critical condition after the blast. Photos showed that one bus had a large hole in the side, and the other had its doors and windows blown off. The majority of casualties were women and children. Kenyan Vice President William Ruto stated that "security agencies are in pursuit of the perpetrators of this heinous and cowardly act", while Kenyan President Uhuru Kenyatta said that "the terrorists will be treated as the vicious criminals they are".

On 16 May 2014, at Gikomba Market in Nairobi, twin explosions claimed the lives of more than ten people.

On 23 May 2014, a grenade was thrown at a police vehicle carrying two suspects in the City of Mombasa. Two people were injured.

On 16 June 2014, at least 48 people were killed when suspected Shebab militants from Somalia stormed into a Kenyan coastal town and launched a major assault on a police station, hotels and government offices, officials said. Around 50 heavily armed gunmen drove into the town of Mpeketoni, near the coastal island and popular tourist resort of Lamu, late on Sunday. Witnesses said they first attacked a police station, before starting to randomly shoot at civilians, some of whom had been watching the World Cup in local bars and hotels.

In late 2014, two attacks believed to have been carried out by Al Shabaab killed 64 persons in Mandera County. On 22 November 2014, gunmen attacked a bus traveling from Mandera to Nairobi, killing 28 persons, mostly teachers and government workers heading to Nairobi for the December holidays.

On 2 December 2014, Al-Shabaab militants attacked and killed a further 36 quarry workers, many of whom were non-Muslims, near Mandera Town.

== Prosecution and arrests ==
Elgiva Bwire Oliacha, a recent Kenyan Muslim convert, was arrested in connection with the two October 2011 blasts and was sentenced to life in prison after having pleaded guilty to all charges. Going by the adopted name Mohamed Seif, Oliacha reportedly smiled at cameras, stated that he harboured no regrets, and indicated that he would not appeal his sentence.

On 20 September 2012, Abdimajid Yasin Mohamed, alias Hussein, was sentenced to 59 years in prison. He was charged alongside Abdi Adan alias Salman Abdi, who denies the allegations and whose case is still pending. Yasin was ordered to undergo psychiatric examination after he pleaded guilty upon arrest on 14 Sep, doctors found him fit to stand trial. The two suspects arrested in Eastleigh with bombs, grenades and a cache of weapons that included six suicide bombs, 12 grenades, four AK 47 rifles and 480 bullets recovered from them as police thwarted a major terror plot in Nairobi.

Police arrested a suspect, Thabit Jamaldin Yahya, in connection with an attack at Mombasa Bella Vista bar in May 2012. He is still in remand.

On 29 September 2012, police arrested over 60 people with possession of bomb making materials. The arrested were on board a bus from Garissa to Nairobi when police discovered the materials. They all disowned the luggage with material.

== See also ==
- 1998 United States embassy bombings
- 2002 Mombasa attacks
- Garissa University College attack
- Aboud Rogo
- Crime in Kenya
- Terrorism in Kenya
- Operation Linda Nchi
