= Bhai Pheru bus bombing =

Bombing in bus at Phool Nagar, Pakistan

- Location: Phool Nagar, Pakistan
- Date: 28 April 1996; 10:30 am local time
- Target: Bus
- Attack type: bombing
- Weapon: Bag bomb
- Deaths: 52
- Injuries: 26
- Perpetrator: foreigners (Pakistani claim)

The Bhai Pheru bus bombing was a bombing targeting a bus in Bhai Pheru (now Phool Nagar), Pakistan, killing 52 and injuring 26.

== Bombing ==
On 28 April 1996, a bus picked up passengers at Kot Radha Kishan bus stop in Bhai Pheru. The 52-seater bus (FDJ 9176) was overcrowded with over 100 passengers on their way to celebrate Eid al-Adha. Someone placed a bomb underneath a seat near the fuel tank of the bus. The bomb exploded at 10:30 am local time, when the bus was passing through the main marketplace in Bhai Pheru. The explosion ruptured the fuel tank of the bus, starting a fire that quickly spread throughout the bus. It took two hours and efforts by firefighters brought from other towns to put out the fire. The bombing killed 52 people and injured 26.
