= 1975 Nairobi bus bombing =

Terrorist bombing attack

On 1 March 1975, a bomb exploded on a crowded bus in central Nairobi in Kenya. It killed at least 27 people and injured another 90 when it detonated, ripping the bus open. The bus was about to leave for Mombasa.

== See also ==
- Terrorism in Kenya
