= Turbi massacre =

2005 tribal massacre in Kenya

The Kenya-Turbi City massacre was the killing of fifty-six people by feuding clans in the remote Marsabit District of Northern Kenya on the early morning of 12 July 2005. Hundreds of armed raiders of the Borana tribe attacked the Gabra people living in the Turbi area northwest of Marsabit. Twenty-two of the sixty confirmed dead were children, and over six thousand people fled their homes, most fleeing to Marsabit town. The massacre's aftermath sparked several violent inter-clan conflicts, raising the death toll to ninety-five.

== Conflicts leading to the Turbi massacre ==
=== Inter-clan tensions ===
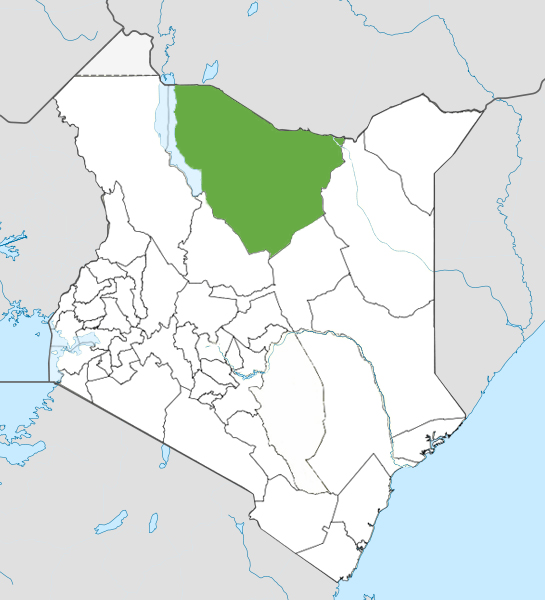
Marsabit District

The Gabra and Borana, two large ethnic clans, have resided in northern Kenya for generations, with the Borana also residing in Southern Ethiopia. While the two clans had coexisted, they would encounter violent inter-clan conflicts consisting of resource disputes and cattle raiding practices typical of the region. The conflict culminating with the Turbi massacre can be traced back to a 2002 unsolved murder of a Gabra man. The Gabra, believing the Borana to be responsible for the murder and, in retaliation, raided the Borana, stealing seven hundred twenty-eight goats. This escalation increased the frequency of conflict, necessitating intervention in the region. In conjunction with the Kenyan government and several NGOs, clan officials held several talks between the two clans devising a peace plan following the framework of the Modogashe Declaration (2001), a document agreed upon by several pastoralist clans, outlining the consequence and reparations of inter-clan violence in Northern Kenya. These meetings were found to be largely inconclusive and unsuccessful. The resolution, which stipulated the transfer of goats as reparations, was largely rejected by both clans. January 2003, the three-year period of escalation within clan relations, Kenyan President Mwaki Kibaki, visited the Madera region in northeastern Kenya, criticizing the reparation system laid out by the Modogashe Declaration. His comments reduced the effectiveness of a system that de-escalated inter-clan conflicts, eventually leading to the District MP dissolving the Modogashe Declaration.

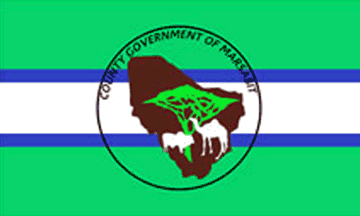
Flag of Marsabit County

Several unsuccessful meetings were called in the following three years to ease clan tensions, all unsuccessful, until peace conditions had finally been agreed upon in May 2005. This peace was short-lived as Ethiopian Boranas were killed, leading to retaliatory conflicts and worsening the already severe clan tensions. The conflict eventually resulted in the death of Borana chief Benjamin Boru Wario. This sparked several more violent attacks, culminating with a series of raids conducted by around one thousand Borana bandits on Gabra villages surrounding Turbi on July 12, 2005.

=== Marsabit-District Pastoralist conflict ===
Northern Kenya, dubbed the "Badlands," is home to extensive livestock production and generations of ethnic pastoral violence. The region is primarily home to nomadic pastoralists. Pastoralists, dependent on the vitality of their livestock, often engage in resource conflicts amongst other pastoralist clans concerning access to water and pasture. As access to resources declines, the frequency of interclan violence increases, along with the prominent culture of cattle theft. Sitting on the border between Ethiopia and Kenya, the region has historically led to ethnic divisions between the transfer of Borana across Ethiopian and Kenyan borders. A consequence of British colonialism was the transfer of nomadic clans across borders, in line with political objectives. This transfer, especially in the crossing of Ethiopian Borana into Kenya, increased the interethnic animosity, as conflict, or instead, difference, was not limited to the ethnic lines but the intersection of national identity.

Marsabit District is located in Kenya's driest region, with around 80% of its population being pastoralists Home to several pastoralist clans ( Gabra, Borana, Turkana, Rendille, and Samburu.) The region is notorious for major violent conflicts between ethnic groups. Following droughts, the nomadic clans tend to converge around existing water sources, often competing for the survival and success of their livestock.

==== OLF involvement ====
Oromo Liberation Front flag Oromo Liberation Front rebels 2006

The Oromo Liberation Front, OLF, has long been associated with the Turbi Massacre. A political party with a military faction, the Oromo Liberation Army (OLA), is believed to have heavily contributed to the Turbi Massacre. The OLF is a nationalist party within Ethiopia that strongly advocates for the self-determination and liberation of the Oromo people. Fighting the Ethiopian and Kenyan governments, the OLF The Gabra and Borana, both of whom fall under the larger Oromo umbrella, share differing stances on the legitimacy of the OLF. The OLF has been primarily run by Ethiopian Boranas, while Kenyan Gabra's have rejected mainly the OLF's vision for the Oromo people. The Turbi Massacre was conducted with military-like precision, pointing to its premeditation and its organization by a larger body. The violence conducted on the Turbi Massacre was not a random spark of violence, instead an organized assault by a military force. Many of the attackers fled into Ethiopia, supporting the notion that the OLF instigated it.

==== Turbi land disputes ====
Turbi, currently recognized as part of the Marsabit District, has remained the center of many post-colonial ethnic and geographic conflicts. Turbi, the site of the massacre, while formally a part of Marsabit District, a primarily Gabra region, was considered a disputed territory, further fueling the tension in the area. Turbi, formerly part of the colonial Moyale District and predominantly Borana, has remained a central political conflict since 1984. MPs, or members of Parliament, local to the region have utilized the dispute as political fuel, promising their constituents the return of the remain of Turbi to either Moyale or Marsabit.

==== Modogashe Declaration (2001) ====
In 2001 pastoral clans in Eastern and North Eastern Kenya agreed upon several stipulations regarding cattle theft and pastoralist violence in the region. The declaration stipulates that 100 cattle should be paid by the bandit or offending party's village for every man killed, 50 for every woman, and 15 for any injuries sustained. In several districts, the declaration served as an effective means of resolving clan disputes and conflicts. While it may not have prevented conflicts between clans, it offered a resolution when followed by the concerned parties. In the conflicts leading up to the Turbi Massacre, the Modogashe Declaration was largely ignored. The Modogashe Declaration has not been observed in Marsabit District since 2004 when it was found to have no legal backing.

== Turbi massacre ==
On July 12, A force of around one thousand Borana bandits conducted a series of six raids on Gabra villages around Turbi. Throughout the attacks, the bandits killed forty-four Gabra, including twenty-two children. The violence throughout the day was particularly harsh, as survivors recall the bandits surrounding Turbi Day School, executing children, as teachers pleaded with their attackers. Of the thousand bandits, twelve were killed in the attack by a group of five, consisting of two police officers and three home guards. Though they eventually ran out of ammunition, their action is believed to have significantly reduced the potential victim total.

During the raids, the bandits were believed to have stolen an estimated 3,000 cattle, 5,000 sheep, and 4,000 camels, in line with several disputes involving cattle before the eventual massacre and the general culture of cattle raiding in the region. Of the 12,000 stolen animals, only around 50% were recovered.

=== Gabra retaliation ===
Similar to the series of skirmishes leading to the massacre, the Gabra responded to the violence with an attack on ten Borana in Bubisa, Kenya. Gabra attackers stormed a church vehicle driven by an Italian priest, removing and killing the Borana, including four children.

=== Government response ===
A week after the massacre, Kenyan Red Cross reported that Marsabit had around nine thousand displaced people, mainly Gabra. The Red Cross appealed for KSh.53.9 million/= (US$709,000) in aid but received only a tiny proportion of their request. Following the massacre, the Kenyan government faced widespread backlash for its inadequate response and failure to prevent it. Northern Kenya has long been subjected to gross neglect by the government, failing to provide adequate security and lacking the concern to do so. The government has long failed to develop the region, allowing for political, economic, and social instability and fostering a culture of violence and lawlessness. There had been clear evidence of an impending attack in Turbi, pointing to government failure to place preventative measures. The attack was so anticipated, as the reason most victims of the attack were children and elderly because the men were in the fields where they expected the attack to occur, Nineteen days before the massacre, an MP had called a press conference to discuss the inevitability of a severe interethnic conflict, due to an increase in sporadic killings and violence, since January 2005. The Kenyan government recognized its role in the massacre but vehemently denied its negligence contributed to the violence. Defending themselves, they pointed out the several peace talks they had conducted before the massacre. The government cited political ethnocentrism as the key contributor to the conflict, claiming they had done an adequate intervention, but could not prevent hostilities fueled by political leaders in the region

It took twelve hours for news of the Turbi Massacre to reach Marsabit Town. Troops were dispatched, killing ten bandits and recovering around five thousand sheep by dusk. A military force authorized by Kibaki of around two thousand was dispatched but did little to track down the offending Borana bandits as most had already crossed into Ethiopia.

== See also ==
- List of massacres in Kenya
- Cattle raiding in Kenya

== Sources ==
- Sille Stidsen (2006) Indigenous World 2006. IWGIA. ISBN 87-91563-18-6
- "Scores killed in tribal massacre". www.aljazeera.com. Retrieved 2023-04-09
- "How killing of Gabra man led to massacre in Turbi". Nation. 2020-06-28. Retrieved 2023-04-10.
- Oscar Gakuo Mwangi (2006) Kenya: Conflict in the ‘Badlands’: The Turbi massacre in Marsabit district, Review of African Political Economy, 33:107, 81–91, doi:10.1080/03056240600671324
- "Massacare in Marsabit". Nation. 2020-07-03. Retrieved 2023-04-10.
- Schlee, Günther, and Abdullahi A. Shongolo. “The Post-Moi Period 2002–2007.” Pastoralism and Politics in Northern Kenya and Southern Ethiopia, Boydell & Brewer, 2012, pp. 115–36. JSTOR 10.7722/j.ctt3fgkvc.7. Accessed 2 May 2023.
- Galaty, John. “Boundary-Making and Pastoral Conflict along the Kenyan–Ethiopian Borderlands.” African Studies Review, vol. 59, no. 1, 2016, pp. 97–122. JSTOR 24805944. Accessed 4 May 2023.
- Nderitu, Wairimu (2015-12-29) Beyond Ethnicism: Exploring Racial and Ethnic Diversity for Educators. African Books Collective. ISBN 978-9966-1903-4-5.
