= Aboud Rogo =

Kenyan Islamic cleric (1968-2012)

Sheikh Aboud Rogo
- Born: Aboud Rogo Mohammed; 1968; Siyu, Pate Island, Kenya
- Died: 27 August 2012 (aged 44); Mombasa, Kenya
- Cause of death: Gunshot
- Resting place: Mombasa
- Occupations: Imam; Islamic cleric
- Known for: Sanctions against him by the United Nations; death triggered massive protests and violence in Kenya
- Spouse: Khaniya Said Saggar Said (1998–2012)
- Parents: Abdalla Ali (father); Mama Mwanaisha Rogo (mother)

Aboud Rogo Mohammed (1968 – 27 August 2012) was a Kenyan Muslim cleric. He was alleged to have been an Islamist extremist and was accused of arranging funding for the al-Shabaab militia in Somalia. He was shot dead in Kenya, and his death triggered protests and violence by hundreds of protestors. Rogo is the fifth alleged Islamic radical killed in Kenya in 2012. David Ochami, a Kenyan journalist, stated that Rogo had the oratory prowess of Hezbollah leader Hassan Nasrallah and the logic of Egyptian ideologue Yusuf al Qaradawi.

== Early life and education ==
Rogo was born in Siyu Island of Lamu county in around 1968. However, there is another report, claiming that he was born in 1965. His father is Abdalla Ali. His mother is Mama Mwanaisha Rogo, who later died. She was a member of a prominent family. Rogo attended Siyu Primary School, but dropped out before he completed the Standard Seven under the Kenyan educational system. Then he received basic religious education at an intermediate Islamic school, madrassa, in Kisauni, concentrating on Islamic studies. He majored in Tafsir (translation) and Arabic language. Later, he left madrassa to deal with various business activities, including fishing, poultry keeping, and running a small shop.

Rogo took up residence in Mombasa in 1989. In the 1990s, he supported the Islamic Party of Kenya, participating in demonstrations as an activist based in Kongo Mosque in Likoni. He formally became a member of the Islamic Party of Kenya in 1992, and a candidate for civic post in Bondeni ward. However, he failed, and lost his interest in politics.

== 1998 US embassy attacks ==
Aboud Rogo supposedly assisted in the twin US embassy bombings in Nairobi and Dar es Salaam in 1998. One of his aides allegedly helped Fazul Abdullah Mohammed, former leader of Al Qaeda's East Africa cell, carry out the attack that killed 224 people. Rogo's relation with Mohammed was that Rogo allegedly had harboured him on Siyu Island between 2001 and 2003 and introduced Mohammed's wife, a local woman from the island.

== 2002 arrest ==
Rogo was arrested due to his alleged connection with the Kikambala hotel bombing in 2002 together with his father-in-law, Said Saggar Ahmed, Kubwa Mohammed Seif and Salmin Mohammed Khamis. Rogo first became known by the Kenyan security agents after this arrest. In June 2005, Rogo and other suspects were released. The high court Justice John Osiemo said that the prosecutors were unable to prove that Rogo, along with three others, were connected to the attack. Then Rogo started developing relations with groups in Somalia, using his madrassa, called Sirajul Munir, in Mtwapa to recruit Kenyan people to these Somalian groups.

In 2007, Rogo became much more involved in indoctrination of Muslim youths with a weekly lecture at his Masjid Musa in Mombasa as a result of the defeat of Islamic Courts Union in Somalia by the Ethiopian forces. His lectures presented the Somalia war as the ultimate jihad. He issued many advisory opinion (Fatwah) during this period, indicating that working for the Kenyan government was apparently haram (forbidden by Islamic law). In his preachings, Rogo gave a message of martyrdom to young Muslims. He also developed propaganda CDs and other materials praising Al Qaeda. Many of his speeches were posted online and on social media, in which he openly rejected formal learning among others and that were delivered in Swahili. Some of his recordings were transferred to other Swahili-speaking countries, including Tanzania, Rwanda, Uganda and Burundi. Rogo visited Somalia in 2009, and he allegedly joined military training camps there.

== 2012 charges and threats ==
In 2012, police charged Rogo with possession of guns, ammunition, and detonators. He also faced charges of belonging to al-Shabaab. The police said that Rogo was part of a terror cell that was plotting to bomb Kenyan targets over Christmas. However, Rogo was released on bail of 5 million shillings by a Mombasa court in February 2012. He was also instructed to report to nearest police station in Mombasa and Kilifi county and to inform the Kenyan authorities if he travelled out of the country. Briton Samantha Lewthwaite, the widow of Jermaine Lindsay, who was one of the suicide bombers responsible for the 7 July 2005 London bombings, was also part of the cell, and police said that she is currently on the run.

After April 2012 bomb attacks against a church in Mtwapa, Rogo said "in this country we (Muslims) live among infidels", and repeated his claim that Muslims in the Kenyan security services are infidels. In a tape dated 10 April 2012, he described mainstream Muslim leaders as cowards and argued that he preferred the courage of armed robbers. He made similar statements after 6 July terror attack on churches in Garissa.

On 12 July 2012, Rogo sent a letter to the Kenyan Foreign Affairs minister, Sam Ongeri. He stated in the letter that the US drones were targeting him and two others, who were linked to Al Qaeda. However, his letter was not replied. In July 2012, Rogo officially reported threats by police against him to the police, the Kenyan National Commission on Human Rights, and the court which tried him, and asked for protection. Rogo claimed that ten unknown individuals attempted to abduct him and his aide in Nairobi.

== Sanctions ==
On 25 July 2012, Rogo was placed on a UN Security Council sanctions list for providing "financial, material, logistical or technical support to al-Shabaab". The Security Council placed him under sanctions and banned him from leaving Kenya for his links to al-Shabaab. His assets were also frozen by the council. The same sanction was also announced by the Treasury of the United Kingdom on 16 October 2012. The council and the UK's treasury accused him of being the key ideological leader of Kenya's al-Hijra, which is also known as the Muslim Youth Centre, and a close ally of al-Shabaab.

Rogo was also named in a report released by the United States as being the chief representative of al-Shabaab in Kenya, and that he had recruited young men to go fight in Somalia with Islamists. The report said that Rogo had engaged in "acts that directly or indirectly threaten the peace, security or stability of Somalia", specifically in reference to recruiting and fundraising for al-Shabaab. Al-Shaabab declared on 10 February 2012 that it is part of al Qaeda East Africa, after the merge of two groups. As a result, the United States also placed him on the sanction list on 5 July 2012.

== Death ==
On 27 August 2012, Rogo was shot dead by unnamed assailants in Mombasa as he was driving his wife to the hospital. Rogo was shot more than seventeen times in the head and died instantly, while his wife, Khaniya Said, was shot in the leg. Human Rights Watch declared, based on the witnesses' reports, that an unmarked vehicle overtook the car Rogo was driving with six passengers on Malindi road, outside Mombasa, and that two gunmen opened fire on the car. His father, Abdalla Ali, and five-year-old daughter, who were also in the car, were not injured. Said reported that a car from behind aimed at Rogo and shot him on his right side. She also accused the police of killing Rogo, and told police that had come to assist her that "we don't want a post-mortem or any help from you." The Muslim Youth Centre confirmed his death and informed its members about his death in Tanzania. Kenyan security officials claimed that Rogo was killed by his rivals and that the riots that occurred after his death were pre-planned.

=== Burial ===
In the immediate aftermath of the assassination, Rogo's supporters seized his body from the security forces. They carried his body shoulder high to the Masjid Musa Mosque. Then they immediately buried his body at Manyimbo Muslim Cemetery in Tudor with the bloodied clothes intact without prayers and being given ritual bath contra to Islamic conventions. (Muslims who die as martyrs are buried in there same clothes and not washed as they are physically dead but not spiritually dead and they will be raised back to life, being buried in same clothes and not washed is per Islamic belief for a martyr).

=== Reactions ===
The Muslim Human Rights Forum (MHRF) condemned Rogo's death, labelling it as an "extrajudicial killing" and called for an end to "targeted killings and enforced disappearances of terrorism suspects." Both the Muslim Youth Centre and al-Shabaab reacted to his death and described Rogo as a martyr. The Supreme Council of Muslims in Kenya also condemned the killing of Rogo and the riots, particularly those targeting the churches. Human Rights Watch issued a press release on 28 August asking the Kenyan government to initiate an independent inquiry into the killing of Rogo and the subsequent riots in Mombasa. On 30 August 2012, the Russian Foreign Ministry condemned Kenyan Muslim rioters who clashed with security forces in Mombasa.

=== Protests ===
After the killing of Rogo, Mombasa witnessed violent demonstrations, claiming four people's lives and wounding many others as well as damaging three churches. Abdullahi Halakhe, the Kenya analyst of the International Crisis Group, suggested that although the assassination of Rogo triggered the unrest, there are much deeper issues at hand. Richard Lough further argued that the riots revealed deep social, political and sectarian divides experiencing in Kenya and that these could cause more violence ahead of a presidential election in 2013.

On the day of Rogo's death, his supporters consisting of over 2,000 Kenyans protested his assassination in Mombasa, especially in the Majengo area, where Rogo's Musa Mosque is situated. A civilian was killed and two churches were looted. Some of the mob blamed the Kenyan authorities for the killing of Rogo. Aggrey Adoli, a police commander, said that the mob had weapons and machetes and were burning police vehicles. Adoli added that many shops were closed and people were leaving Mombasa, but that the police regained control of the city after a few hours of "anarchy." The highway from Mombasa to Malindi, a tourist centre, was closed by protestors who burned tyres, but they were eventually scattered by police who fired tear gas. Streets that normally bustled with shoppers and tourists were empty.

The next day clashes continued in Mombasa. Two prison officers were killed in the ensuing riots. Anti-riot police fought against stone-throwing youths as police fired tear gas and warning shots. The protesters barricaded streets with burning tyres in Majengo, which is predominantly Muslim. The mobs also taunted police who arrested protestors and marauded around the city centre, while shopkeepers reported looting in certain areas.

The rioters had fired at police with machine guns before hurling a grenade at police officers, which resulted in two deaths. The police said that at least 16 officers were wounded in the attack, which took place in Kisauni, another predominantly Muslim area. In addition, two more churches were set on fire in Kisauni and roads were barricaded with burning tires. Benedict Kigen, a senior police intelligence officer, said that the rioters are "pure criminals, and now terrorists are infiltrating within to launch grenades at us. They are looting even chicken."

On 29 August, Kenyan Coast Regional Prisons leader James Kodiany announced that two more prison officers had succumbed to their injuries from the riots the previous day. Security officials argued that their control in Mombasa was restored. However, it was also added by security officials that tensions were still high. There were reports of unrest in the Majengo and Kisauni districts of Mombasa and four policemen were badly wounded in the late hours in the city. Protests continued for a fourth day.

Abubaker Sharif Ahmed, a close friend of Rogo, was accused of inciting the protests that turned violent. He was then arrested after the issuance of an arrest warrant. He told a court in Mombasa that he denied the charges.

=== Inquiry ===
The Director of Public Prosecutions Keriako Tobiko set up a taskforce to investigate the killing. The inquiry is yet to be concluded.

== Personal life ==
Rogo married Khaniya Said Saggar Said in 1998. She is the daughter of Said Saggar Ahmed, the well-known terror suspect in Kenya. Rogo's son, Khubedi Rogo, was arrested in Kanamai, Kilifi, in November 2012 for his alleged participation in training camps of al-Shabaab.

== See also ==
- Mombasa Republican Council, a secessionist group in the predominantly Muslim coastal region around Mombasa.
