= Gikomba market =

Open-air market in Nairobi

Coordinates: 1°17′11″S 36°50′29″E

Gikomba market is an open-air market in Nairobi, Kenya. The market includes sellers of a wide range of goods, including food and clothing. It is particularly noted for having a large number of secondhand clothing (mitumba) sellers, reported to be the most of any market in the country.

== History ==
Gikomba was founded as early as the 1950s. The market was demolished for a first time in the 1970s. On 16 October 1990 the market was bulldozed by the Kenyan government, because of the prevalence of illegal selling.

The market has seen several fires, notably the "Great Gikomba Fire" on 6 September 2000, which burned for eight hours in the used clothing section of the market. In May 2014, two bombs were set off in the market.

In 2014, the Nairobi government reported that around 65,000 people worked in some capacity in the market, and there were an estimated 10,000 different shops. By 2024, the government reported that 100,000 people worked in the market.

On the early morning night of 31 March 2026, Nairobi County authorities demolished part of the market's shoe section following the lapse of a 30 day notice. This was after the 2026 Kenya floods which included flooding of areas near water banks with officials saying the move would reduce the dangers posed by future such disasters. The move was criticized for lack of alternative plans for the merchants.

The demolitions will continue as part of a wider plan to rebuild using modern structures. The first phase of the project is projected to last for 4 to 6 months with the entire project costing more than Ksh. 5 billion.
