= Gikomba bombings =

2014 IED explosions in Nairobi, Kenya

2014 Gikomba explosions
- Location: 1°17′11.5″S 36°50′29.9″E; Nairobi, Kenya
- Date: 16 May 2014 (East Africa Time)
- Attack type: Explosion, terrorist attack
- Weapon: Improvised explosive devices
- Deaths: 12+
- Injuries: 70-76

OpenStreetMap view of attack location

On 16 May 2014, two improvised explosive devices were detonated simultaneously in the Gikomba market in Nairobi, Kenya, killing at least 12 people and injuring 70. The first blast came from a minibus and the second from within the market. Two people were reportedly arrested at the site of the explosions. Shortly after the attacks, hundreds of people swarmed onto the crime scene despite police efforts to stop them.

== Background ==
Shortly before the blasts, 400 British on holiday had been evacuated from Mombasa, the country's second largest city, due to the British Foreign Office declaring an "unacceptably high" threat level. The day before the blasts, the United States had also issued a similar warning, which stated: "The U.S. government continues to receive information about potential terrorist threats aimed at U.S., Western, and Kenyan interests in Kenya, including the Nairobi area and the coastal cities of Mombasa and Diani." It had also said that their embassy in Kenya was going to increase its security in the week preceding the bombings. Uhuru Kenyatta, the president of Kenya, dismissed these warnings, saying they "strengthen the will of terrorists" and that terrorism is a problem in many other countries as well. In the week prior to the blasts, Kenya's government required all bus passengers to be screened before boarding buses and required all buses have clear glass windows.

== Reactions ==
Uhuru Kenyatta, the President of Kenya, reacted to the explosions by saying that "All of us around the world must be united to ensure that we are able to fight this particular terror." Kenya's government, convinced that the perpetrators were Somalian terrorists, reacted to the attacks by rounding up thousands of immigrants, refugees and members of Kenya's large Somali community.

=== Flight cancellations ===
The Foreign and Commonwealth Office (FCO) has advised against all but essential travel to Mombasa Island off Kenya's coast. Thomson Airways and First Choice Airways cancelled all their flights to Mombasa until the end of October, citing the FCO's advice.

=== Economic impact ===
After the Gikomba explosions, which were the latest in a long line of attacks occurring in Kenya in recent months, the value of the Kenyan shilling decreased by 0.2% that day.

=== United States Embassy ===
The United States Department of State announced on the day of the bombings that it was planning on reducing the number of staff it would employ at its embassies in Kenya.

== Perpetrator ==
While no one has claimed responsibility for the attacks, Kenyatta stated that terrorists were responsible. Suspicions have, in particular, fallen on Somalia-based terrorist group al-Shabaab, since they were responsible for several previous terrorist attacks in Kenya due to Kenya sending troops to Somalia in 2011. The Gikomba attack occurred two miles from Al-Shabaab's so-called "Little Mogadishu" stronghold in Nairobi.
