= July 2014 Kenya attacks =

2014 Lamu attacks
- Location: Lamu and Tana River counties, Kenya
- Date: 6 July 2014
- Attack type: Terrorist attack
- Weapons: Guns, knives
- Deaths: 29
- Perpetrator: Al-Shabaab or Mombasa Republican Council

On the night of 5–6 July 2014, heavily armed men attacked the Kenyan villages of Hindi in Lamu County and Gamba in Tana River County. At least 29 people were killed in the attacks.

== Attacks ==
About 11pm local time on 5 July 2014, about 12 men opened fire in a trading centre of Hindi, Lamu County. The attackers also burned Government buildings and a church. They targeted men, tying their victims up before shooting them in the head or slashing their throats with a knife. The attackers said the attack was revenge for the theft of Muslim lands. According to the Interior Ministry nine people were killed in the attack. Most of the victims were ethnic Kikuyus.

A separate attack in Gamba in Tana River County occurred about the same time. Dozens of militants broke into a police station and attempted to free suspects held in connection with Al-Shabaab claimed attacks from mid June. After what police Deputy General Grace Kaindi described as a "fierce shoot-out", it was unclear how many, if any, prisoners had escaped. Twenty people died in the attack.

== Perpetrators ==
The militant group Al-Shabaab claimed responsibility through spokesperson Sheikh Abdiasis Abu Musab. The group was originally based in Somalia, but has expanded its scope into a regional force in recent years, with Kenya being the most frequent target outside Somalia. The group has a "sophisticated propaganda machine" with websites and radio broadcasts in the Kiswahili language. Kenya has sent troops into Somalia as part of an African Union force to battle Al-Shabaab, in an operation known as Operation Linda Nchi.

The Kenyan Deputy President William Ruto claimed the attack was the work of political rivals. "We want to tell our friends they cannot blackmail us using criminal elements in our country," he said. "You want to make the country ungovernable so you can get into office through the back door, that will not happen in Kenya." Kaindi said a blackboard left at the scene of the attack could indicate that the separatist Mombasa Republic Movement (MRC) was responsible. MRC denied any role in the attack, saying the government was using them as a scapegoat. Political tension in Kenya is high, and opposition leader Raila Odinga has used recent attacks as a chance to criticise the government.

Independent security experts said it was unclear who had perpetrated the attacks of 5 July, as well as the earlier mid-June attacks. Whatever the cause(s), the violence severely damaged Kenya's tourism industry on which it relies heavily.
