= Mpeketoni =

- Town
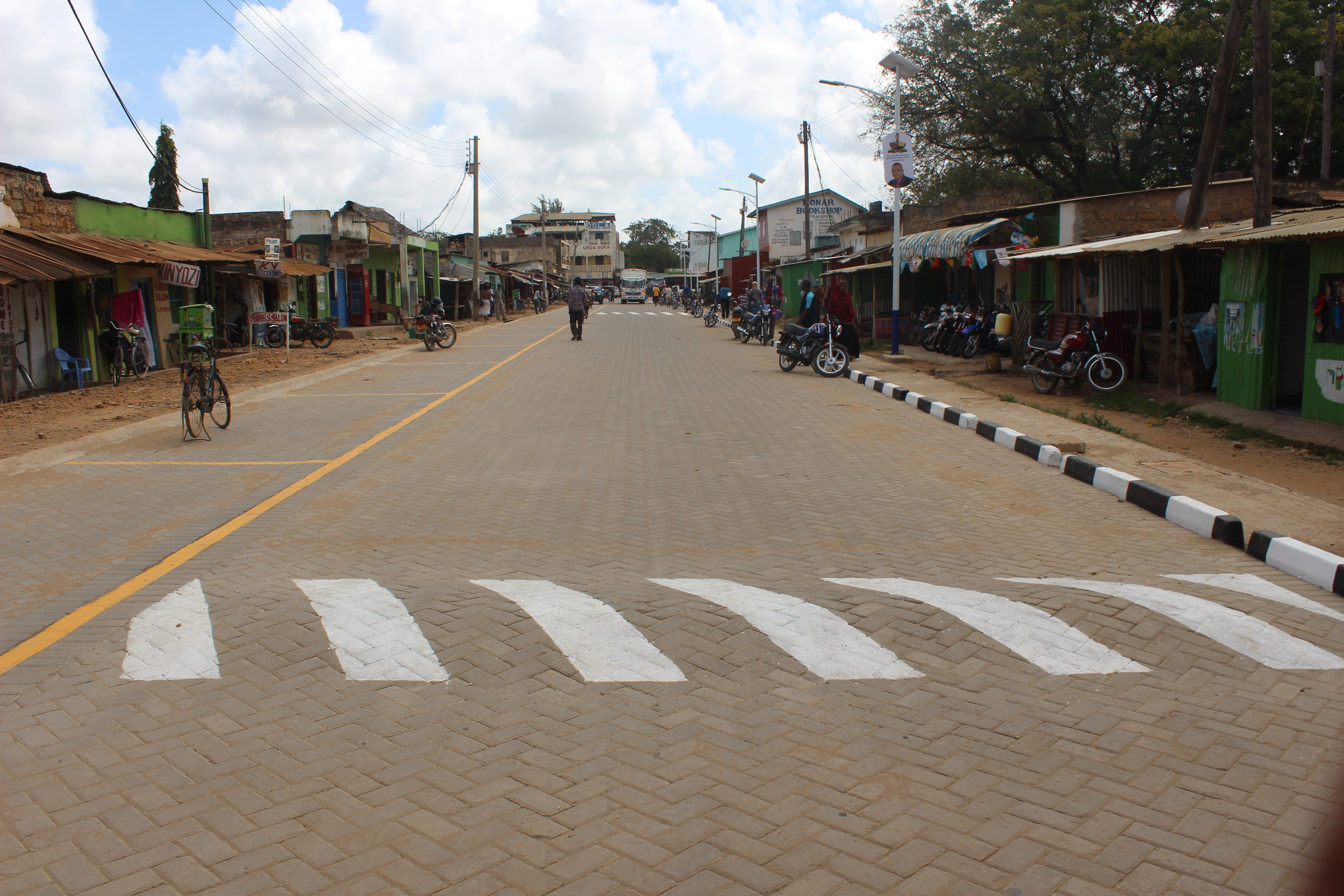
- Nickname: Mpeks
- Location in Kenya
- Coordinates: 02°23′20″S 40°25′19″E
- Country: Kenya
- County: Lamu County
- Elevation: 10 m (33 ft)

Population (2015 Estimate)
  - Total: 50,000
- Time zone: UTC+3 (EAT)
- Postal Code: 80503

Mpeketoni is a town in Lamu County, on the Kenyan coast. It is a settlement scheme started in the 1960s by the first president of the Republic of Kenya, Jomo Kenyatta. The settlement is near a fresh water lake bearing his name.

== Location ==
Mpeketoni lies in Lamu County, 9 kilometres (6 mi), south of the Garsen–Witu–Lamu Highway, approximately 45 kilometres (28 mi) southwest of Mokowe, on the coast. The coordinates of the town are: 2°23'28.0"S, 40°41'50.0"E (Latitude:-2.391119; Longitude:40.697233).

== History ==
Originally, Mpeketoni and its surroundings were inhabited by Swahilis called Wabajuni and a small hunting and gathering tribe by the name of Wasanye or the Sanyes who are almost extinct. In the early 1970s Mpeketoni was transformed into a settlement area for landless Kenyans. According to local legend, an officer in charge of the resettlement effort said "mpe katoni" ("give him/her a carton") to the settlers as they stepped off of the lorries that transported them, and this eventually became the name of the town.

Most of those who settled there were Kenyans from up country, largely members of the Kikuyu community who had been living in Tanzania but decided to return home because of the changing political climate. The Kikuyu tribe, which is traditionally a farming community, mostly populates this area. Other tribes found in Mpeketoni include the Luos and Kambas as well as the original local Swahili people.

The town is on a route that was used by the Arab traders taking their commodities "slaves" to Lamu Island. Up to now huge mango trees along the way from Mpeketoni to Lamu Island are still visible and are said to have grown from the seeds of the mangoes slaves were eating.

== Overview ==
The land has since been painstakingly transformed to arable land for farming. The main cash crops include maize, cotton, cassava, cashew nuts, mangoes, and bananas.

The people of Mpeketoni have benefited from the efforts from a variety of non-profit organizations, a German not-for-profit organization GTZ and a Dutch philanthropist with ongoing charity projects since 1987. Schools, a clinic and a church have been built with funds collected from the Netherlands in collaboration with the Groen van Prinsterer school in Vlaardingen, in the Netherlands. The clinic was named Maria Teresa Nuzzo Health Centre after the foundress of the Catholic Sisters', a congregation that run it. It is now the Mpeketoni Hospital. Mpeketoni is host to Lake Kenyatta, a fresh-water lake that covers about 5 square kilometres (1,200 acres). The lake is an ecological site with variety of fish, not less than 3,500 hippos and a large array of birds.

== Population ==
As of June 2015, the population of the town was estimated at 50,000.

== Administration ==
The Division is divided into small administrative villages, including Kiongwe, Baharini, Mkunumbi, Bomani, Uziwa, Mapenya, Lakeside, Kibaoni, Hongwe and Tewa.

== Mpeketoni attacks ==
On June 16, 2014, gunmen killed at least 48 people in a bloody attack.

== See also ==
- List of roads in Uganda
