= Mpeketoni attacks =

2014 attacks in Mpeketoni, Kenya

2014 Mpeketoni attacks
- Location: Mpeketoni, Kenya
- Date: 15 June 2014; 17:30 (GMT)
- Attack type: Terrorist attack, mass murder, arson, anti-Christian hate crime, mass shooting, van hijacking
- Deaths: 60+
- Perpetrator: Al-Shabaab

Between 15 June and 17 June 2014, more than 60 people were killed in attacks in and near Mpeketoni, Kenya. The Somalia-based Al-Shabaab militant group claimed responsibility, but the Kenyan President Uhuru Kenyatta asserted that the attacks were organized by local politicians with ties to a network of gangs. Correspondents from the area suggested that the attacks may have been motivated by ethnic or religious hatred, or revenge for land grabbing.

== First attack ==
On 15 June 2014, about 50 masked gunmen hijacked a van and raided a police station in the predominantly Christian town of Mpeketoni, Kenya. According to a local policeman, the gunmen then shot men at random as women were forced to watch. An eyewitness, however, said that the attackers were targeting Christians. "They came to our house at around 8pm and asked us in Swahili whether we were Muslims," she said. "My husband told them we were Christians and they shot him in the head and chest." The assailants also burned hotels, restaurants, and government offices.

According to Kenyan President Uhuru Kenyatta, the Mpeketoni police received warning of the attack ahead of time, but did not act on the warning. No on-duty police were killed in the attack and military reinforcements stationed 30 kilometres (19 mi) away did not arrive until 10 hours after the attack, leading The Standard to declare the "government fed us to the dogs". The newspaper's investigation suggested police had ignored calls for help, in some cases turning off their radios. Others were watching World Cup games and did not receive notice of the situation. An eyewitness said he was told police vehicles did not have sufficient fuel to respond to his distress call. The police commissioner, who was reportedly suspended after the attack, stated "We responded robustly but we were overwhelmed."

After the attacks, angry local Kenyans brandishing weapons subsequently took to Mpeketoni's streets in protest.

At least 53 people were reportedly killed during the attack, and eight others were unaccounted for as of 18 June. Most of the dead Kenyans were Kikuyus.

== Second attack ==
On 17 June 2014, assailants set fire to houses in the villages of Majembeni and Poromoko, near Mpeketoni. At least fifteen people were killed in the overnight attacks. According to an eyewitness, the attackers also went door-to-door, pulling people out of their homes and demanding they prove they were Muslim. Initial reports also said twelve women were abducted during the raid, although that was later proven incorrect.

After the second attack, Kenyan security forces located a group of suspects armed with AK-47's fleeing from Mpeketoni. Five of the suspects were killed in a gun battle with security forces, while an undetermined number of others escaped.

== Perpetrators ==
Although no group immediately claimed responsibility for the first attack, Kenyan army spokesman Major Emmanuel Chirchir said the "assailants [are] likely to be Al-Shabaab".

Al-Shabaab claimed responsibility for the second attack, saying its members had killed 20 people. The group stated that the attacks were "revenge for the presence of Kenyan troops in Somalia and the killing of Muslims." District deputy commissioner Benson Maisori also reported the waving of the Al-Shabaab flag. However, Kenyatta asserted that local politicians, who were connected with a network of gangs, had instigated the attacks, and dismissed Al-Shabaab's claim of responsibility.

Many locals accused the Kenyan government of attempting to enrich Kikuyus by giving them land. This grievance was also behind the fatal ethnic violence that took place following the disputed 2007 Kenyan elections. President Kenyatta, a Kikuyu himself, described the attacks as "politically motivated ethnic violence against a Kenyan community, with the intention of profiling and evicting them for political reasons". The opposition leader Raila Odinga, who Kenyatta had defeated in the 2013 general election, denied involvement in the violence and suggested that Kenyatta's remarks were "unfortunate and unjustified".

Correspondents from the area conjectured that ethnic Somali or Oromo residents may have perpetrated the attack and attempted to deflect blame onto Al-Shabaab by using the group's flag as a guise.

On 25 June, Lamu County Governor Issa Timamy was arrested on charges related to the attack.
