= Garissa massacre =

1980 massacre of ethnic Somali residents in Kenya

The Garissa massacre or Bulla karatasi massacre was a 1980 massacre of ethnic Somali residents by the Kenyan government in the Garissa District of the North Eastern Province, Kenya.

Garissa (Kenya)

The incident occurred when a local gangster known as Abdi Madobe set fire to a Kenya Defence Forces camp in the Northern Frontier District, killing soldiers. Kenyan government forces, acting on the premise of flushing him out, then forcefully interned the populace at Garissa Primary School's football pitch for three days without water or food, resulting in over 3,000 deaths. Apart from Somalis, residents were permitted to leave the school pitch unharmed. The government of Somalia, then led by the Supreme Revolutionary Council, intervened by threatening that if such brutalities did not cease, the Somali military would overthrow the Nairobi regime and occupy the country. Consequently, the Kenyan government lifted the curfew and released the detained individuals unconditionally.
