= 2002 Mombasa attacks =

Terrorist attacks in Kenya

- Location: 4.05°S 39.666°E; Mombasa, Kenya
- Date: 28 November 2002; 23 years ago
- Target: Israeli hotel and plane
- Attack type: Car bombing, suicide attack, attempted shootdown, terrorism
- Weapon: Surface-to-air missile
- Deaths: 13 victims (3 Israelis, 10 Kenyans) and 3 suicide bombers
- Injuries: 80
- Perpetrator: al-Qaeda

The 2002 Mombasa attacks were two coordinated terrorist attacks on 28 November 2002 in Mombasa, Kenya, against an Israeli-owned hotel and a plane belonging to Arkia Airlines. An all-terrain vehicle crashed through a barrier outside the Paradise Hotel and blew up, killing 13 and injuring 80. At the same time, attackers fired two surface-to-air missiles at an Israeli charter plane. The Paradise Hotel was the only Israeli-owned hotel in the Mombasa area.

The attacks were believed to be orchestrated by al-Qaeda operatives in Somalia in an attempt to disrupt the Israeli tourist industry on the African continent. Much speculation has occurred as to who the perpetrators are, but no complete list of suspects has been defined. The attack was the second al-Qaeda terrorist operation in Kenya, following the bombing of the U.S. embassy in Nairobi in 1998.

The UN Security Council and other nations condemned the bombing.

== Attacks ==
=== Hotel bombing ===
Three men approached the gate of the Paradise Hotel in a Mitsubishi Pajero and were questioned by security guards. One of the men exited the car and detonated his explosive vest. The other two men rammed through the barrier, crashing into the front entrance of the hotel and set off a bomb in the vehicle. The blast occurred on the eve of Hanukkah, just after 60 Israeli visitors had checked into the hotel for a holiday stay. The explosion killed 13 people, including ten Kenyans and three Israelis, and injured 80. Nine of the victims were dancers who had been employed to welcome hotel guests. In an overnight rescue mission, four Lockheed C-130 Hercules operated by the Israeli Air Force were sent to Mombasa to evacuate the dead and injured.

=== Arkia Israel Airlines Flight 582 ===
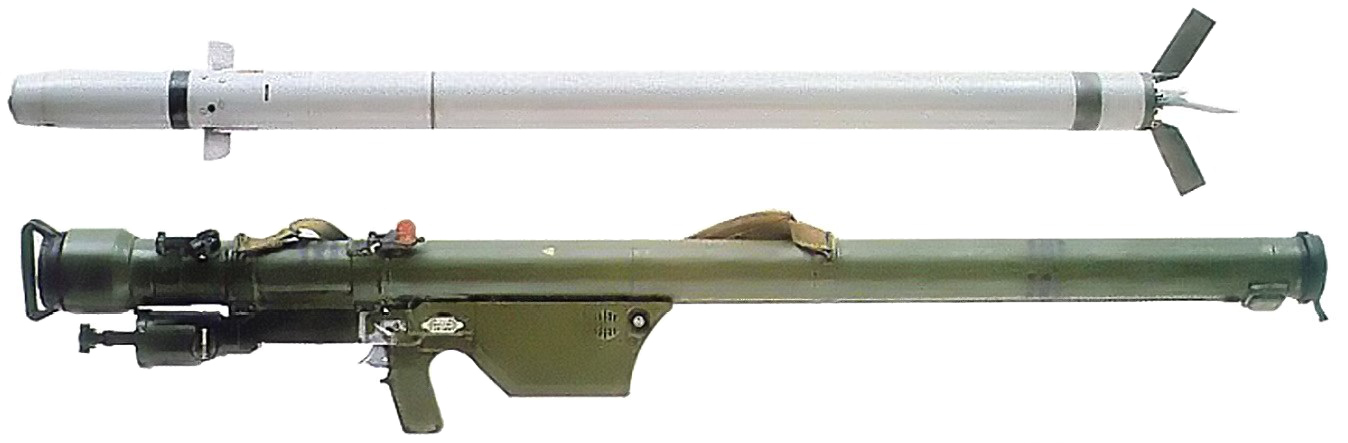
Two Strela 2 missiles were fired during take-off, but missed the plane.

Almost simultaneous to the attack on the hotel, two shoulder-launched Strela 2 (SA-7) surface-to-air missiles were fired at a chartered Boeing 757 owned by Israel-based Arkia Airlines as it took off from Moi International Airport. The Arkia charter company had a regular weekly service flying tourists between Tel Aviv and Mombasa. Kenyan police discovered a missile launcher and two missile casings in the Changamwe area of Mombasa about 2 kilometres (1.2 mi) from the airport. The pilots planned on an emergency landing in Nairobi after seeing the two missiles streak past them, but decided to continue to Israel. The airliner landed at Ben Gurion Airport in Tel Aviv about five hours later, escorted by Israeli F-15 fighter jets. Following the attack, all flights from Israel to Kenya were cancelled indefinitely.

Arkia Israel Airlines Flight 582
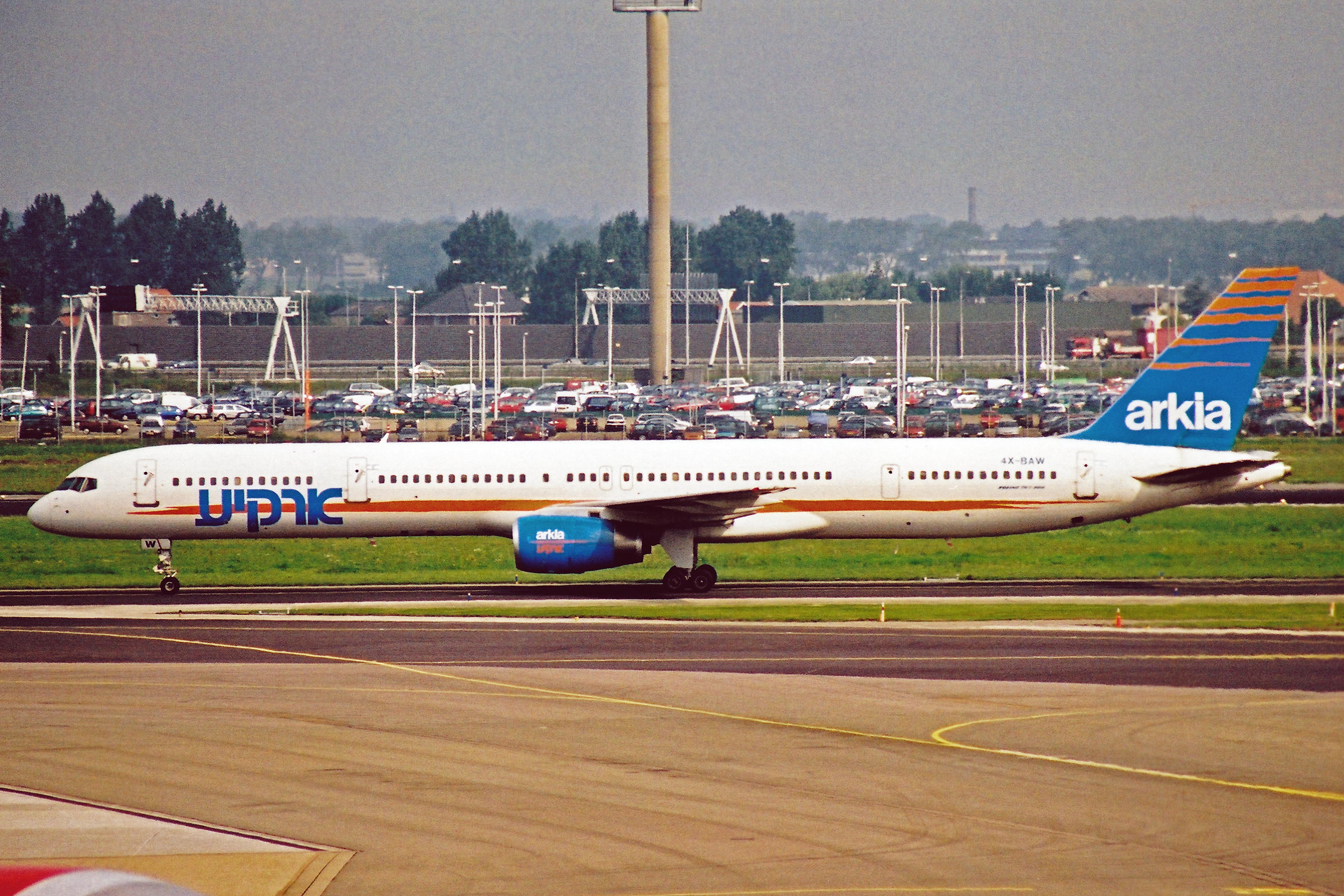
- 4X-BAW, the aircraft involved in the incident, seen in August 2002

Accident
- Date: 28 November 2002
- Summary: Near shootdown during takeoff
- Site: near Moi International Airport

Aircraft
- Aircraft type: Boeing 757-3E7
- Operator: Arkia
- Registration: 4X-BAW
- Flight origin: Moi International Airport, Mombasa, Kenya
- Destination: Ben Gurion Airport, Central District, Israel
- Occupants: 271
- Passengers: 261
- Crew: 10
- Fatalities: 0
- Injuries: 0
- Survivors: 271

== Perpetrators ==
Sheikh Omar Bakri Mohammed, leader of the London-based Islamic organisation Al Muhajiroun, said that warnings had appeared on the Internet. "Militant groups who sympathise with Al-Qaeda warned one week ago that there would be an attack on Kenya and they mentioned Israelis," he said. Initially, Israeli government spokesmen denied that such a warning had been received. But four days after the blast, Brigadier-General Yossi Kuperwasser admitted that Israeli military intelligence were aware of a threat in Kenya, but that it was not specific enough. Former Mossad head Danny Yatom took a similar line, saying that Israel got so many terror warnings they were not taken seriously.

In Lebanon, a previously unknown group called the Army of Palestine has said it carried out the attacks and said it wanted the world to hear the "voice of the refugees" on the 55th anniversary of the partition of Palestine.

On 20 December 2006, Salad Ali Jelle, Defence Minister of Somalia's Transitional Federal Government, said that one of the suspects, Abu Talha al-Sudani, was an Islamic Courts Union leader fighting against the Transitional Federal Government in the 2006 Battle of Baidoa. On 14 September 2009, American troops killed Kenya-born Saleh Ali Saleh Nabhan after a missile struck his car in the Barawe District, 250 kilometers south of Somalia's capital Mogadishu. Nabhan is believed to have bought the truck used in the 2002 bombing.

Fazul Abdullah Mohammed was a foreign leader of the jihadist fundamentalist group, Al-Shabaab, which has pledged allegiance to al-Qaeda. Mohammed was appointed leader of al-Qaeda operations in East Africa. He was a participating member of the 1998 U.S. Embassy bombing in Nairobi and was one of the masterminds behind the coordination of the attack in Mombasa. He saw the attack as a failure because of the Strela 2 missiles missing the plane during takeoff.

Mohammed Abdul Malik Bajabu confessed in 2007 to assisting in the car bombings that took place at The Paradise Hotel. He was arrested by Kenyan authorities and was imprisoned by the U.S. in Guantanamo Bay without any formal charges against him. There have been four other suspected attackers affiliated with the al-Qaeda cell in Kenya, but the Kenyan prosecutors have had trouble establishing guilt with certainty. The four Kenyan nationals have been acquitted for lack of evidence.

There also has been speculation of involvement by Somali terrorist organization known as, Al Ittihad al Islamiya (AIAI). AIAI has supposed ties with al-Qaeda. They had hoped that by sending a message to the Israelis through this attack, they would grow closer to achieving their goal of establishing a Somali Islamic state.

However, a former Israeli Intelligence official accused Abdullah Ahmed Abdullah, known as Abu Mohammed al-Masri, of ordering the Mombasa attacks.

=== Motivation ===
It is believed that the terrorist cell al-Qaeda sought out to severely diminish Israeli activities on the African continent. The two simultaneous attacks had a direct impact on the Israeli tourism industry. The Paradise Hotel was an Israeli-owned beachfront property that many Israeli vacationers frequented. The Al-Shabaab militant group is concentrated in Somalia, but because of weak border security, its members often enter Kenya. Kenya has a minority Muslim population that has historically been alienated, and with a growing dissent for Western activities regarding Kenyan borders, it has enabled a growing number of jihadist Muslims into Nairobi. The Muslim community in Kenya had lost political and economic representation leading up to the attacks, which led them to focus their loyalty on Islam and the Middle East, not Kenya. This enabled the jihadist movement to acquire a strong grip within Kenya, as Kenyan nationals assisted in the attacks on the Paradise Hotel and on the Boeing 757.

== International response ==
Immediately following the attacks, Israel began evacuating all Israeli citizens within Kenyan borders. A joint operation began between the United States and Israel in determining who the perpetrators were of the attack. President George W Bush and Secretary of State Colin Powell of the United States, Israel's Foreign Minister Benyamin Netanyahu, the Kenyan government, and United Kingdom Foreign Secretary Jack Straw all condemned the attack. The United Nations Security Council adopted Resolution 1450 condemning the attacks, Syria was the only country to not affirm the resolution due to the implied power of directly intervening in the affected country's internal affairs after a terrorist attack. They also found distaste with the repeated mention of Israel in the resolution, which was against their political view concerning the conflict in the Middle East between Israel and Palestine.

=== Investigation ===
As a result of the U.S. embassy bombing in 1998 and the attacks in Mombasa, Kenya-U.S. cooperation between authorities has strengthened. It was a joint effort between Kenya, the U.S., and Israel to apprehend the attackers. They were able to determine that al-Qaeda operatives were behind the attacks due to the similarities between the incidents in Nairobi and Mombasa. The attackers had used car bombs sourced from local materials. To plan and coordinate the attacks, al-Qaeda operatives rented houses in affluent neighborhoods to meet up with the non-Kenyan suicide bombers.

==== Aftermath ====
In 2003 Western countries advised all of their citizens against traveling to Kenya because of the terrorist threat. This negatively impacted Kenya's economy which was based mostly in the tourism industry. Following the advisories and the suspension of British Airways flights to Nairobi, the Kenyan economy began losing nearly $130 million per week.

== See also ==
- 1980 Nairobi hotel bombing
