= List of cities and towns in Kenya by population =

Kenya has five incorporated cities including the capital and largest city, Nairobi, the second-largest city of Mombasa, and the third-largest city, Kisumu. The fourth city to be awarded the status was Nakuru, which was upgraded from a municipality on 1 December 2021. The fifth was Eldoret, which was elevated on 15 August 2024. Apart from these five cities, there are numerous municipalities and towns with significant urban populations.

== Top 100 list ==
The list:

| Capital city |
| City |
| Municipality |
| Others |

The municipalities of Ruiru, Kikuyu, Thika, Mavoko, and Ngong which feature on the top 10 list of the most populated towns in Kenya also fall within the Nairobi Metropolitan region. Data for the largest urban centers in Kenya was provided under the Kenya Population Census of 2019.

| № | City/ Town | Status | Population | County | Ref |
|---|---|---|---|---|---|
| 1. | Nairobi | Capital | 4,397,073 | Nairobi | |
| 2. | Mombasa | City | 1,208,333 | Mombasa | |
| 3. | Nakuru | City | 570,674 | Nakuru | |
| 4. | Ruiru | Municipality | 490,120 | Kiambu | |
| 5. | Eldoret | City | 475,716 | Uasin Gishu | |
| 6. | Kisumu | City | 397,957 | Kisumu | |
| 7. | Kikuyu | Municipality | 323,881 | Kiambu | |
| 8. | Ngong | Municipality (Ngong + O/Rongai) | 279,757 | Kajiado | |
| 9. | Mavoko | Municipality (Mlolongo + Athi River + Syokimau + Katani + Githunguri) | 258,498 | Machakos | |
| 10. | Thika | Municipality | 251,407 | Kiambu/Murang'a | |
| 11. | Naivasha | Municipality | 198,444 | Nakuru | |
| 12. | Karuri | Municipality (Ruaka + Ndenderu) | 194,342 | Kiambu | |
| 13. | Kitale | Municipality | 162,560 | Trans Nzoia | |
| 14. | Juja | Municipality | 156,041 | Kiambu | |
| 15. | Kitengela | Municipality (Kitengela + Kisaju) | 154,643 | Kajiado | |
| 16. | Kiambu | Municipality | 155,896 | Kiambu | |
| 17. | Malindi | Municipality | 119,859 | Kilifi | |
| 18. | Mandera | Municipality | 114,718 | Mandera | |
| 19. | Kisii | Municipality | 112,417 | Kisii/Nyamira | |
| 20. | Kakamega | Municipality | 107,227 | Kakamega | |
| 21. | Mtwapa | Municipality | 90,677 | Kilifi | |
| 22. | Wajir | Municipality | 90,116 | Wajir | |
| 23. | Lodwar | Municipality | 82,970 | Turkana | |
| 24. | Limuru | Municipality | 81,316 | Kiambu | |
| 25. | Meru | Municipality | 80,191 | Meru | |
| 26. | Nyeri | Municipality | 80,081 | Nyeri | |
| 27. | Isiolo | Municipality | 78,650 | Isiolo | |
| 28. | Ukunda | Municipality (Diani Municipality) | 77,686 | Kwale | |
| 29. | Kiserian | Town Council | 76,903 | Kajiado | |
| 30. | Kilifi | Municipality | 74,270 | Kilifi | |
| 31. | Nanyuki | Municipality | 72,813 | Laikipia/Nyeri | |
| 32. | Busia | Municipality | 71,886 | Busia | |
| 33. | Migori | Municipality | 71,668 | Migori | |
| 34. | Bungoma | Municipality | 68,031 | Bungoma | |
| 35. | Narok | Municipality | 65,430 | Narok | |
| 36. | Embu | Municipality | 64,979 | Embu | |
| 37. | Machakos | Municipality | 63,767 | Machakos | |
| 38. | El Wak | Municipality | 60,732 | Mandera | |
| 39. | Gilgil | Municipality | 60,711 | Nakuru | |
| 40. | Kimilili | Municipality | 56,050 | Bungoma | |
| 41. | Kericho | Municipality | 53,804 | Kericho | |
| 42. | Voi | Municipality | 53,353 | Taita-Taveta | |
| 43. | Wanguru | Municipality | 51,722 | Kirinyaga | |
| 44. | Habaswein | Town Council | 49,599 | Wajir | |
| 45. | Turi | Municipality | 48,356 | Nakuru | |
| 46. | Moyale | Other Centre | 47,850 | Marsabit | |
| 47. | Homa Bay | Municipality | 44,949 | Homa Bay | |
| 48. | Kenol | Other Centre | 44,086 | Muranga | |
| 49. | Masalani | Town Council | 43,642 | Garissa | |
| 50. | Muranga | Municipality | 43,314 | Muranga | |
| 51. | Webuye | Municipality | 42,642 | Bungoma | |
| 52. | Njoro | Town Council | 42,173 | Nakuru | |
| 53. | Kapsabet | Municipality | 41,997 | Nandi | |
| 54. | Mumias | Municipal | 41,942 | Kakamega | |
| 55. | Kerugoya-Kutus | Municipality | 39,188 | Kirinyaga | |
| 56. | Nyahururu | Municipality | 37,650 | Laikipia/Nyandarua | |
| 57. | Marsabit | Municipality | 36,289 | Marsabit | |
| 58. | Rhamu | Town Council | 35,644 | Mandera | |
| 59. | Siaya | Municipality | 33,153 | Siaya | |
| 60. | Mariakani | Municipality | 31,715 | Kwale/Kilifi | |
| 60. | Maralal | Municipality | 31,350 | Samburu | |
| 61. | Mairo-Inya | Municipality | 30,527 | Nyandarua | |
| 62. | Kitui | Municipality | 29,062 | Kitui | |
| 63. | Makutano | Town Council | 28,469 | West Pokot | |
| 64. | Elburgon | Town Council | 28,359 | Nakuru | |
| 65. | Watamu | Town Council | 27,857 | Kilifi | |
| 66. | Lamu | Municipality | 25,385 | Lamu | |
| 67. | Kajiado | Municipality | 24,678 | Kajiado | |
| 68. | Nyamira | Municipality | 24,483 | Nyamira | |
| 69. | Isebania | Town Council | 23,891 | Migori | |
| 70. | Karatina | Municipality | 23,552 | Nyeri | |
| 71. | Kakuma | Town Council | 22,984 | Turkana | |
| 72. | Lafey | Town Council | 22,882 | Mandera | |
| 73. | Bondo | Municipality | 22,712 | Siaya | |
| 74. | Kabarnet | Municipality | 22,474 | Baringo | |
| 75. | Chuka | Municipality | 22,388 | Tharaka-Nithi | |
| 76. | Kehancha | Municipality | 22,194 | Migori | |
| 77. | Maua | Municipality | 22,121 | Meru | |
| 78. | Taveta | Town Council | 22,018 | Taita-Taveta | |
| 79. | Takaba | Town Council | 114,718 | Mandera | |
| 80. | Eldama Ravine | Town Council | 21,385 | Baringo | |
| 81. | Hola | Municipality | 20,912 | Tana River | |
| 82. | Mai Mahiu | Other Centre | 20,823 | Nakuru | |
| 83. | Rongo | Municipality | 20,688 | Migori | |
| 84. | Oyugis | Municipality | 19,947 | Homabay | |
| 85. | Wote | Municipality | 19,725 | Makueni | |
| 86. | Emali | Municipality | 62,404 | Makueni/Kajiado | |
| 87. | Garbatula | Other Centre | 17,443 | Isiolo | |
| 88. | Mbale | Other Centre | 17,404 | Vihiga | |
| 89. | Mwingi | Municipality | 17,025 | Kitui | |
| 90. | Awendo | Municipality | 16,815 | Migori | |
| 91. | Kiminini | Town Council | 16,560 | Trans Nzoia | |
| 92. | Moi's Bridge | Other Centre | 16,355 | Uasin Gishu/Trans Nzoia | |
| 93. | Mazeras | Other Centre | 16,254 | Kwale/Kilifi | |
| 94. | Malaba | Municipality | 15,581 | Busia | |
| 95. | Makindu | Town Council | 15,038 | Makueni | |
| 96. | Banissa | Other Centre | 14,974 | Mandera | |
| 97. | Msambweni | Other Centre | 14,951 | Kwale | |
| 98. | Namanga | Other Centre | 14,922 | Kajiado | |
| 99. | Mbita | Municipality | 14,916 | Homa Bay | |
| 100. | Isinya | Other Centre | 14,429 | Kajiado | |

== Distribution ==
| County | Number of Cities/ Towns (Top 100) |
|---|---|
| Kiambu | 7 |
| Kajiado | 5 |
| Bungoma, Kericho, Kilifi, Kisumu, Machakos, Nakuru, Kisii | 4 |
| Busia, Homa Bay, Kajiado, Kakamega, Laikipia, Migori, Taita-Taveta | 3 |
| Embu, Kitui, Meru, Murang'a, Nyamira, Siaya, Turkana, Trans-Nzoia, Uasin Gishu, Vihiga | 2 |
| Baringo, Bomet, Elgeyo-Marakwet, Garissa, Isiolo, Kirinyaga, Kwale, Mandera, Marsabit, Nandi, Narok, Nyandarua, Nyeri, Samburu, Tharaka-Nithi, Wajir, West Pokot. | 1 |
