= North Eastern Province (Kenya) =

Province of Kenya

North Eastern Province: Mkoa wa Kaskazini Mashariki (Swahili); Goboleedka Waqooyi-bari (Somali)
- Former province
- Location in Kenya
- Coordinates: 1°0′N 40°15′E
- Country: Kenya
- Capital: Garissa

Area
  - Total: 127,358.5 km^{2} (49,173.4 sq mi)

Population (2009)
  - Total: 6,310,757
  - Density: 49.55113/km^{2} (128.3368/sq mi)
- Time zone: UTC+3 (EAT)

North Eastern Province (Swahili: Mkoa wa Kaskazini Mashariki, Somali: Goboleedka Waqooyi-bari) was one of the former provinces of Kenya. It had a land area of 127,358.5 km^{2}, with its capital at Garissa. The North Eastern Province was carved out of the then Northern Frontier District (NFD) prior to independence.

During negotiations for Kenya's independence, Britain granted administration of the NFD which included all of the North Eastern province to Kenyan nationalists despite an informal plebiscite showing the overwhelming desire of the region's population to join the newly formed Somali Republic. It is, and has historically been, mostly inhabited by Somalis.

== Demographics ==
As of 2009, the North Eastern Province had a population of 2,310,757 residents. These census results were however nullified by the then Planning Minister Wycliffe Oparanya citing inconsistencies in the birth and death rates. On 21 March 2016, the court of appeal in Nairobi, declared the disputed census results valid. The North Eastern Province is predominantly inhabited by ethnic Somalis.

The Somalis in the North Eastern Province of Kenya numbered close to three million in the 2019 National Census with another 280,000 settled in refugee camps from neighbouring Somalia.

== Administration ==
North Eastern Province had thirteen constituencies represented in the National Assembly of Kenya, under the Government of Kenya. The Regional Commissioner sat in Garissa. The last Regional Commissioner was Mohamed Birik.

As the capital of Garissa County, Garissa is the seat of the County Government of Garissa as well as the County Assembly. The town is represented by Aden Bare Duale, a Somali Member of Parliament for the Garissa Township Constituency and who also doubles as the Leader of the Majority in the legislature. He was appointed to the position in the 2013 general elections. The county is also home to Ijara, Dadaab, Lagdera, Fafi and Balambala constituencies.

Wajir is the largest county in the former North Eastern Province with approximately an area of 56,000km2. The county has six constituencies. They include Eldas, Tarbaj, Wajir East, Wajir North, Wajir West, and Wajir South.

Mandera County is at the furthermost bordering both the Somalia and Ethiopia's Somali Region. It has six constituencies just like the rest of the counties in the North Eastern province. These constituencies include Banissa, Lafey, Mandera East, Mandera North, Mandera South, Mandera West and Takaba.

== Economy ==
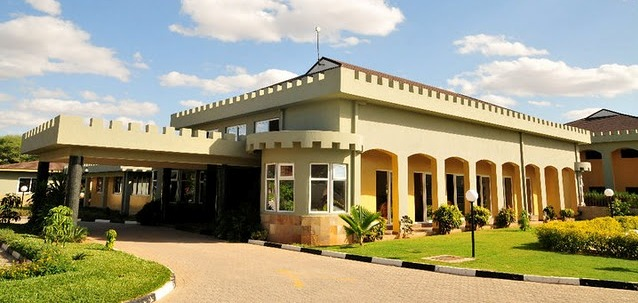
The Almond Resort in Garissa

Livestock and agricultural production is a significant part of the region's economy. Between 2005 and 2007, Garissa cattle producers earned over 1.8 billion shillings in sales in domestic and overseas markets. Construction of a new abattoir also began in October 2007. In terms of livestock imports, most of Garissa's cattle comes from cross-border trade between Somali livestock merchants.

== Transportation ==
North Eastern Province is served by the Wajir Airport. It handles about seven flights per day. As of September 2012, civil flights are offered twice a week by Echo. Most flights, however, are cargo. Some charter and military flights are additionally accommodated.

== Climate and habitat ==
North Eastern Province has a semi-arid and hot desert climate (Köppen BSh and BWh). Rain falls infrequently, usually only around April or October, and quite sporadically from year to year. Although the southwestern section of the Somali autonomous region is extremely fertile near the Tana River and there is much farming.

There is a major river called Tana River which is located in the southwestern section of the region. Wildlife in the area include the lion, elephant, buffalo, zebra, hyena, gazelle, giraffe, leopard, cheetah, and ostrich. Hippopotamus and crocodiles are mainly located on the river.

== Counties ==
Code	County	Former province	Area (km^{2})	Population Census 2009	Capital
7	Garissa	North Eastern	45,720.2	623,060	Garissa
8	Wajir	North Eastern	55,840.6	661,941	Wajir
9	Mandera	North Eastern	25,797.7	1,025,756	Mandera
	Totals		127,358.5	2,310,757	-

=== After 2007 ===
District	Capital
Fafi	Bura
Garissa	Garissa
Ijara	Masalani
Lafey Constituency	Lafey
Mandera Central	El Wak
Mandera East	Mandera
Mandera West	Takaba
Wajir East	Wajir
Wajir North	Bute
Wajir South	Habaswein
Wajir West	Griftu

== See also ==
- Greater Somalia
