= Urbanization in Kenya =

Urbanization in Kenya by County

Kenya remains a relatively rural country, with only 31.2% of its population, approximately 14.84 million people, living in urban areas as of the 2019 census. Urbanization varies significantly from county to county, being highest in the Greater Nairobi Metropolitan Area and lowest in predominantly rural counties in the western and south-eastern parts of the country. Nairobi and Mombasa had 100% urbanization rate, Meanwhile Kiambu (70.6%), Kajiado (55.7%), Nakuru (48.4%) and Isiolo (46.9%) are also among the most urbanized counties, while Bomet (3.2%), Elgeyo-Marakwet (4.5%) and Kitui (4.8%) are the three least urbanized. The remaining 68.8% of the population, approximately 32.76 million people, live in rural areas.

== County ==
Urbanization rate by county in Kenya (2019)
Rank	County	Urbanization rate (%)
1	Nairobi	100.0
1	Mombasa	100.0
3	Kiambu	70.6
4	Kajiado	55.7
5	Nakuru	48.4
6	Isiolo	46.9
7	Uasin Gishu	43.9
8	Kisumu	38.2
9	Mandera	31.2
10	Machakos	29.1
11	Taita-Taveta	27.5
12	Lamu	27.4
13	Kilifi	27.1
14	Garissa	25.1
15	Tana River	24.7
16	Laikipia	24.6
17	Marsabit	23.3
18	Wajir	22.7
19	Kirinyaga	22.3
20	Nyeri	19.9
21	Trans Nzoia	18.0
22	Turkana	15.2
22	Samburu	15.2
24	Migori	15.0
25	Kwale	14.6
26	Busia	12.7
27	Embu	12.5
28	Kisii	12.0
29	Bungoma	11.4
30	Baringo	11.3
31	Murang'a	11.2
32	Kericho	10.4
32	Nyandarua	10.4
34	Homa Bay	10.0
35	Kakamega	9.9
35	Vihiga	9.9
37	Meru	9.0
38	Narok	8.7
39	Siaya	8.6
40	Tharaka-Nithi	8.3
40	Nyamira	8.3
42	Makueni	7.8
43	Nandi	6.7
44	West Pokot	5.1
45	Kitui	4.8
46	Elgeyo-Marakwet	4.5
47	Bomet	3.2

== History ==
Kenya's urbanization has evolved from a small network of colonial administrative and railway towns into a rapidly expanding urban system dominated by Nairobi, Mombasa, Kisumu, Nakuru and other regional centres.

In the pre-colonial period (before 1895), the area now known as Kenya had few large settlements. Urbanization was mostly concentrated in the coastal area, within the Swahili city-states, with Mombasa being the largest urban centre and a major trading centre in the Indian Ocean trade. Other urban centres included Lamu and Malindi, which served as major commercial centres in Kenya. Inland settlements were predominantly rural, with populations distributed among agricultural and pastoral communities.

During the colonial era, Kenya saw a marked shift in urbanization as a result of the construction of the Uganda Railway, which connected Mombasa to parts of the Kenyan interior and Uganda, accelerating the growth of urban centres. Nairobi developed around the Uganda Railway depot in 1899 and became the colonial administrative capital. Kisumu also grew as a railway and port terminus on Lake Victoria, while Nakuru and Eldoret emerged as other important railway towns. In 1907, Nairobi became the capital of British East Africa and developed into a major urban centre.

After independence in 1963, urbanization accelerated as the new government expanded public administration, education, healthcare, infrastructure and commercial activities. Rural–urban migration became increasingly important as people moved to towns in search of employment, education and better access to services.

The number of recognized urban centres increased from 34 in 1962 to 91 in 1979. In the late 20th century, Kenya experienced substantial urban population growth as a result of economic diversification, the expansion of commercial and manufacturing activities and services, rural–urban migration, and the expansion of the private sector and informal economy. Nairobi remained the dominant urban centre. By 1999, Kenya had approximately 180 recognized urban centres, compared with 91 in 1979.

The 2000s marked a major period of urban expansion. Nairobi experienced substantial suburban growth, with settlements expanding towards areas such as Ruiru, Kikuyu, Athi River, Kitengela and Ngong. Other towns also expanded, including Nakuru, Eldoret, Thika, Kisumu and Meru.

Following the introduction of devolution under the 2010 Constitution, the institutional environment for urban development changed. County governments assumed responsibilities relating to urban planning, local infrastructure, markets, waste management and other municipal services, contributing to the emergence and growth of regional towns and county headquarters. As of 2019, there were 372 urban centres, an increase from 230 in 2009.

== Urban Centers ==
Top 100 largest Urban centres in Kenya by total population
Rank	Urban centre	County	Total population
1	Nairobi City	Nairobi City	4,397,073
2	Mombasa	Mombasa	1,208,333
3	Nakuru	Nakuru	570,674
4	Ruiru	Kiambu	490,120
5	Eldoret	Uasin Gishu	475,716
6	Kisumu	Kisumu	397,957
7	Kikuyu	Kiambu	323,881
8	Thika	Murang'a/Kiambu	251,407
9	Naivasha	Nakuru	198,444
10	Karuri	Kiambu	194,342
11	Ongata Rongai	Kajiado	172,569
12	Garissa	Tana River/Garissa	163,399
13	Kitale	Trans Nzoia	162,174
14	Juja	Kiambu	156,041
15	Kitengela	Kajiado	154,436
16	Kiambu	Kiambu	147,870
17	Mlolongo	Machakos	136,351
18	Malindi	Kilifi	119,859
19	Mandera	Mandera	114,718
20	Kisii	Nyamira/Kisii	112,417
21	Kakamega	Kakamega	107,227
22	Ngong	Kajiado	102,323
23	Mtwapa	Kilifi	90,677
24	Wajir	Wajir	90,116
25	Lodwar	Turkana	82,970
26	Limuru	Kiambu	81,316
27	Athi River	Machakos	81,302
28	Meru	Meru	80,191
29	Nyeri	Nyeri	80,081
30	Isiolo	Isiolo	78,650
31	Ukunda	Kwale	77,686
32	Kiserian	Kajiado	76,903
33	Kilifi	Kilifi	74,270
34	Nanyuki	Nyeri/Laikipia	72,813
35	Busia	Busia	71,886
36	Migori	Migori	71,668
37	Bungoma	Bungoma	68,031
38	Narok	Narok	65,430
39	Embu	Embu	64,979
40	Machakos	Machakos	63,767
41	Githunguri	Machakos	63,319
42	El Wak	Mandera	60,732
43	Gilgil	Nakuru	60,711
44	Kimilili	Bungoma	56,050
45	Kericho	Kericho	53,804
46	Voi	Taita/Taveta	53,353
47	Wanguru	Kirinyaga	51,722
48	Habaswein	Wajir	49,599
49	Turi	Nakuru	48,356
50	Moyale	Marsabit	47,850
51	Homa Bay	Homa Bay	44,949
52	Kenol	Murang'a	44,086
53	Masalani	Garissa	43,642
54	Murang'a	Murang'a	43,314
55	Webuye	Bungoma	42,642
56	Njoro	Nakuru	42,173
57	Kapsabet	Nandi	41,997
58	Mumias	Kakamega	41,942
59	Nyahururu	Laikipia	37,650
60	Marsabit	Marsabit	36,289
61	Rhamu	Mandera	35,644
62	Siaya	Siaya	33,153
63	Mariakani	Kwale/Kilifi	31,715
64	Maralal	Samburu	31,350
65	Mairo Inya	Nyandarua	30,527
66	Kerugoya	Kirinyaga	30,045
67	Kitui	Kitui	29,062
68	Makutano	West Pokot	28,469
69	Elburgon	Nakuru	28,359
70	Watamu	Kilifi	27,857
71	Lamu	Lamu	25,385
72	Kajiado	Kajiado	24,678
73	Nyamira	Nyamira	24,483
74	Isebania	Migori	23,891
75	Karatina	Nyeri	23,552
76	Kakuma	Turkana	22,984
77	Lafey	Mandera	22,882
78	Bondo	Siaya	22,712
79	Kabarnet	Baringo	22,474
80	Chuka	Tharaka-nithi	22,388
81	Kehancha	Migori	22,194
82	Maua	Meru	22,121
83	Taveta	Taita/Taveta	22,018
84	Takaba	Mandera	21,517
85	Eldama Ravine	Baringo	21,385
86	Hola	Tana River	20,912
87	Mai Mahiu	Nakuru	20,823
88	Rongo	Migori	20,688
89	Oyugis	Homa Bay	19,947
90	Wote	Makueni	19,725
91	Emali	Makueni/Kajiado	18,325
92	Garbatula	Isiolo	17,443
93	Mbale	Vihiga	17,404
94	Mwingi	Kitui	17,025
95	Awendo	Migori	16,815
96	Kiminini	Trans Nzoia	16,560
97	Moi's Bridge	Uasin Gishu	16,355
98	Mazeras	Kwale/Kilifi	16,254
99	Malaba	Busia	15,581
100	Makindu	Makueni	15,038
