= Isiolo–Mandera Road =

Kenyan road

B9 Road
- Isiolo–Mandera Road

Route information
- Length: 748 km (465 mi)

Major junctions
- Southwest end: Isiolo
- Wajir
- Northeast end: Mandera

Location
- Country: Kenya
- Counties: Isiolo County, Wajir County, Mandera County
- Major cities: Isiolo, Garba Tula, Mado Gashi, Habaswein, Wajir, Tarba, El Wak, Rhamu, Mandera

Highway system
- Transport in Kenya

Isiolo–Mandera Road, is a road in Kenya. It is a major transport route linking north-central Kenya to Kenya's northeast. The counties that the road traverses are generally arid, and have hitherto been undeserved. This road project is the largest and most expensive infrastructure project in northeastern Kenya since the country became independent in 1963.

== Location ==
The road starts in the town of Isiolo and proceeds in a northeasterly direction through the towns of Garba Tula, Mado Gashi, Habaswein, Wajir, Tarba, El Wak and Rhamu, to end at Mandera, a total distance of approximately 748 kilometres (465 mi). The road traverses Isiolo County, Wajir County and Mandera County.

== Overview ==
This major transport corridor has been in poor physical condition, since Kenya became independent in 1963. The government of Kenya, with financial backing by the World Bank, plans to upgrade the gravel-surface road to class II bitumen standard, with culverts and drainage channels. As of February 2020, the Kenya National Highways Authority (KeNHA), has divided the road into nine sections, each to be tendered separately. It is estimated that the entire 750 kilometres (466 mi) project, will cost in excess of KSh85 billion (approx. US$856 million).

== Intersections ==
These are the major intersections along this road: The Lamu–Garissa–Isiolo Road at Mado Gashi. Intersections with planned roads include the Isiolo-Lokichar Road at Isiolo and the Isiolo-Moyale Road also at Isiolo.

== Funding ==
In September 2020, the World Bank lent KSh81.3 billion (US$756.3 million) to the government of Kenya towards the tarmacking of this road to class II bitumen standard, with culverts, drainage channels and shoulders. The World Bank loan will be sufficient to fund the tarmacking 365 kilometres (227 mi) of the 748 kilometres (465 mi) Isiolo–Mandera Regional Road Corridor and 30 kilometres (19 mi) of spur roads. The remaining 383 kilometres (238 mi) will be tarmacked with funding from other development partners.

== See also ==
- Trans-African Highway network
- List of roads in Kenya
