= 2019 Wajir police attack =

Jihadist attack in Wajir County, Kenya

- Part of Somali civil war (2009-present)
- Location: Between Khorof Harar and Konton, Wajir County, Kenya
- Date: June 15, 2019
- Target: Kenya Police Reserve
- Deaths: 12
- Perpetrator: al-Shabaab

On June 15, 2019, an al-Shabaab IED bombed a vehicle of the Kenya Police Reserve on the road between Khorof Harar and Konton in Wajir County, Kenya. Twelve police officers were killed in the attack.

== Background ==
Northern Kenya, particularly Wajir and Mandera counties, have been prone to incursions from the al-Qaeda affiliated militant group al-Shabaab, based across the border in southern Somalia, for a decade. In January 2019, al-Shabaab militants attacked the Nairobi DusitD2 complex attack in Nairobi, a rare attack in Kenya outside of the north, killing 21 people. A month later, another attack killed three Christian teachers in Wajir.

== Attack ==
At the time of the attack, a Kenyan Police Reserve vehicle was driving between the villages of Khorof Harar and Konton, in Wajir County, when their vehicle hit an IED placed by al-Shabaab. The vehicle was chasing after al-Shabaab militants that had kidnapped three KPR officers. Initial reports stated that eleven police officers were in the vehicle, and eight of them were killed. The death toll later climbed to twelve killed, out of thirteen people in the car.

The Kenyan government launched an investigation into suspected moles within its ranks after the attack.
