= Ogorwen and Orgene ambushes =

- Part of Spillover of the Somali civil war
| Date | July 5 and 7, 2023 |
| Location | Ogorwen, El Wak, and Orgene, Mandera County, Kenya |
| Result | Kenyan victory |

Belligerents
| Kenya | al-Shabaab |

Units involved
| Special Operations Group; Kenya Police | Unknown |

Casualties and losses
| 11 killed 16 injured | 43 killed |

Between July 5 and 7, 2023, al-Shabaab militants ambushed Kenyan soldiers near the villages of Ogorwen and Orgene, Mandera County, Kenya, killing a total of eleven Kenyan soldiers and over 40 jihadists.

== Background ==
Al-Shabaab has maintained a presence in northern Kenya's Wajir and Mandera counties bordering Somalia since the start of the Somali Civil War in 2009. In June 2023, a month prior to the ambush in Orgene, attacks by al-Shabaab killed 25 people in Wajir county, a significant uptick in attacks since the start of 2023.

== Ambushes ==
The first ambushes took place at Ogorwen and El Wak in Mandera County on July 5. Al-Shabaab militants ambushed an army camp hosting Special Operations Group soldiers, resulting in a battle that killed 20 jihadists. The battle lasted for several hours, and Kenyan officials said that all 20 jihadists involved in the battle were killed, and that eight soldiers were injured. Five policemen were killed in the ambush at El Wak.

The next ambush occurred at Orgene, also in Mandera County, on July 7. In this battle, 23 jihadists were killed, alongside six Kenyan soldiers killed and eight injured.
