= Elwak–Mandera Road =

Rural road in Kenya

Coordinates: 03°26′10″N 40°57′52″E

Route information
- Length: 100 mi (160 km)
- History: Designation TBD; Completion TBD

Major junctions
- South end: Elwak
- Rhamu
- North end: Mandera

Location
- Country: Kenya

Highway system
- Transport in Kenya

The Elwak–Mandera Road, is a rural road in Kenya. The road links Elwak, to the town of Mandera, in the country's extreme northeast, near the tri-point where the borders of Kenya, Ethiopia and Somalia meet.

== Location ==
The road starts at Elwak, Mandera County, at the border with the town of El Wak, Somalia. It travels in a general northerly direction through a village called Warankara, continuing north to the town of Rhamu, at the border with Ethiopia, a distance of approximately 143 kilometres (89 mi). At Rhamu, the road turns east for another 73 kilometres (45 mi) to end at Mandera, the headquarters of Mandera County, a total distance of 216 kilometres (134 mi).

== Overview ==
This road is an important transport corridor for traffic from Mombasa and Nairobi destined for Mandera. It also facilitates trade between Kenya and her neighbors to the north and northeast; Ethiopia and Somalia respectively. Travel along this road, although safer compared to a shorter route through Lafey, is longer in distance and bumpier, due to the rough condition of the road.

== Updating to bitumen surface ==
In March 2016, the government of Kenya publicly committed to upgrading this gravel-surfaced road to class II bitumen surface with culverts, drainage channels and shoulders, before the end of 2018.

== See also ==
- List of roads in Kenya
