= Mandera Central Constituency =

Kenyan electoral constituency

Mandera Central Constituency is a former electoral constituency in Kenya. It was one of three constituencies in Mandera District. The constituency has 12 wards, all electing councillors to the Mandera county Council. The constituency was established for the 1988 elections.

== Members of Parliament ==
Elections	MP	Party	Notes
1988	Adan Mohamed Nooru	KANU	One-party system
1992	Adan Mohamed Nooru	KANU	
1997	Adan Mohamed Nooru	KANU	
2002	Adan Kerrow Billow	KANU	
2007	Abdikadir Hussein Mohamed	Safina	
2012	Adan Mohamed Nooru	United Republic Party	
2017	Bashir Maalim Abdullahi	Jubilee Party	

== Wards ==
Wards
Ward	Registered Voters
As-Habito	593
El Wak North	1,260
El Wak South	4,363
Guticha	879
Kutulo North	2,161
Kutulo South	1,569
Marothile	645
Olla	635
Rhamu	4,330
Rhamu Dimtu	3,202
Shimbir Fatuma	1,850
Wargadud	1,893
Total	23,380
*September 2005.
