= Mandera North Constituency =

Electoral constituency of Kenya

Mandera North
- constituency for the Parliament of Kenya
- Mandera North Constituency within Mandera County

- Mandera County within Kenya
- County: Mandera County, Mandera
- Population: 143,850
- Area: 5,138 km^{2} (1,983.8 sq mi)

Current constituency
- Number of members: 1
- Party: UDM
- Member of Parliament: Bashir Sheikh Abdullahi
- Wards: 5

Mandera North is a constituency in Kenya. Its one of six constituencies in Mandera County.

== Members of Parliament ==
Elections	MP	Party	Clan
1988	Adan Mohamed Nooru	KANU	Garre
1992	Adan Mohamed Nooru	KANU	Garre
1997	Adan Mohamed Nooru	KANU	Garre
2002	Adan Kerrow Billow	KANU	Garre
2007	Abdikadir Hussein Mohamed	Safina	Degodia
2012	Adan Mohamed Nooru	United Republic Party	Garre
2017	Bashir Maalim Abdullahi	JP	Degodia
2022	Bashir Maalim Abdullahi	UDM	Degodia

== Wards ==
Ward
As-Habito
Guticha
Morothile
Rhamu
Rhamu Dimtu
