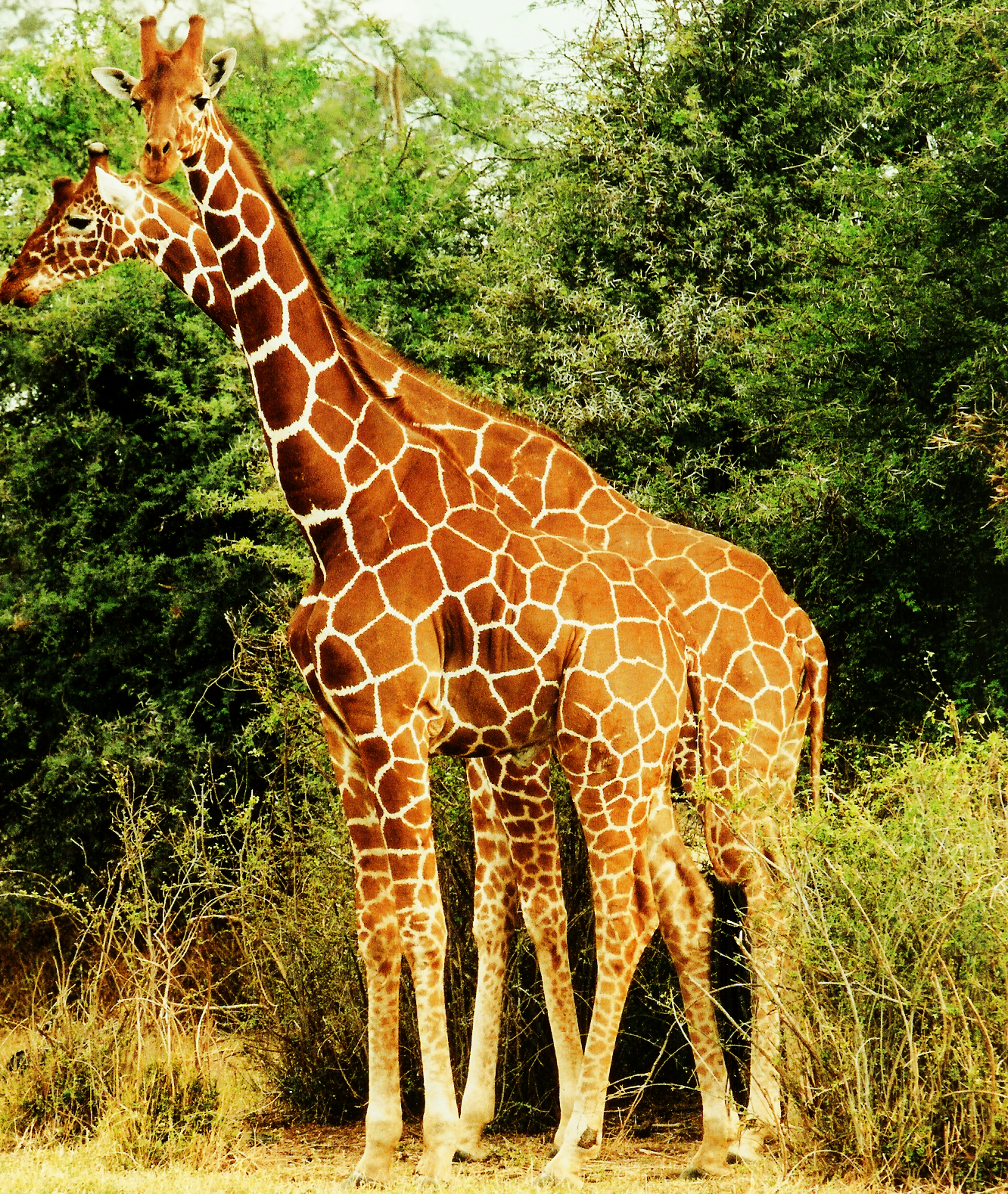

Conservation status
- Endangered (IUCN 3.1)

Scientific classification
- Kingdom: Animalia
- Phylum: Chordata
- Class: Mammalia
- Order: Artiodactyla
- Family: Giraffidae
- Genus: Giraffa
- Species: G. reticulata

Binomial name
- Giraffa reticulata (de Winton, 1899)
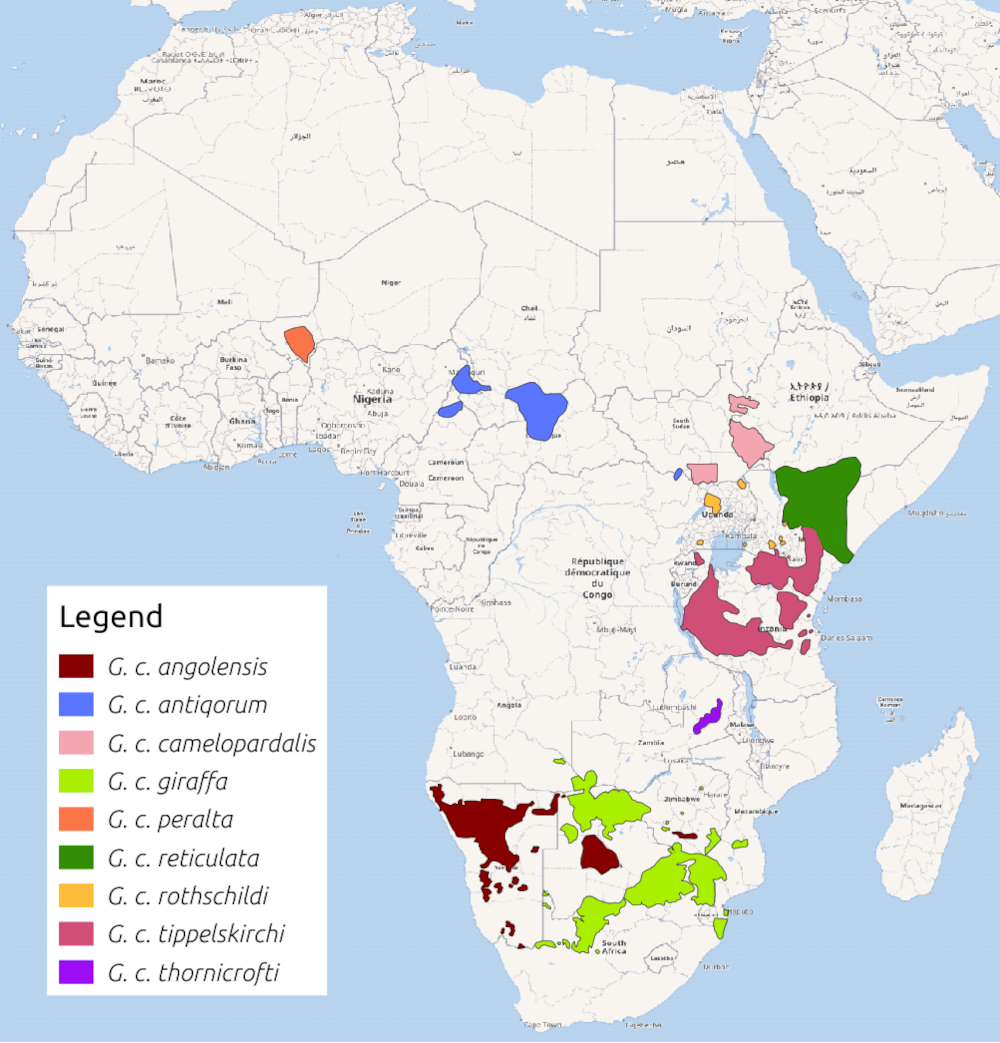
- Range in dark green

Synonyms
- Giraffa camelopardalis reticulata

Audio

= Reticulated giraffe =

Reticulated giraffe Temporal range: Pleistocene - Recent

Species of giraffe

The reticulated giraffe (Giraffa reticulata) also known as the Somali giraffe is a species of giraffe native to the Horn of Africa. It is differentiated from the other giraffe species by its coat, which consists of large, polygonal (or squared), block-like spots, which extend onto the lower legs, tail and face. These prominent liver-red spots also show much less white between them, when compared to other giraffe species. With up to 6 meters in height, the reticulated giraffe is the largest species of giraffe and the tallest land animal in general. While the reticulated giraffe may yet still be found in parts of its historic range, such as areas of Somalia and Ethiopia, its population stronghold is primarily within Kenya. There are approximately 8,500 individuals living in the wild. In both captivity and the wild, as of 2024 there are 15,785 individuals across the world.

Reticulated giraffes can interbreed with other giraffe species in captivity, or if they come into contact with other species of giraffe in the wild, such as the Masai giraffe (G. tippelskirchii).

Along with the aforementioned Masai giraffe, as well as the Baringo or Rothschild's giraffe (G. c. rothschildi), the reticulated giraffe is among the most commonly seen giraffe species in animal parks and zoos.

== Taxonomy ==
As of August 2025, the IUCN recognizes four species of giraffe, northern giraffe, reticulated giraffe, Masai giraffe and southern giraffe. All living giraffes were originally classified as one species by Carl Linnaeus in 1758. It was described and given the binomial name, Giraffa reticulata, by British zoologist William Edward de Winton in 1899.

Classed within the infraorder Pecora, the closest extant relative of giraffes is the elusive okapi (Okapia johnstoni) of Central Africa, with both species possessing a long, black, prehensile tongue for browsing foliage as well as ossicones, the bony, horn-like skull growths on the animal's forehead (often tipped with tufts of fur). A common ancestor between giraffes and okapi emerged an estimated 11.5 mya. The closest living relative to both giraffes and okapi outside of Africa is the North American pronghorn (Antilocapra americana) of the Antilocapridae, in which it is the sole extant species. Additionally, deer (Cervidae) are distantly related to giraffes, okapi and pronghorn, as they are also classed within the infraorder Pecora.

== Distribution and habitat ==
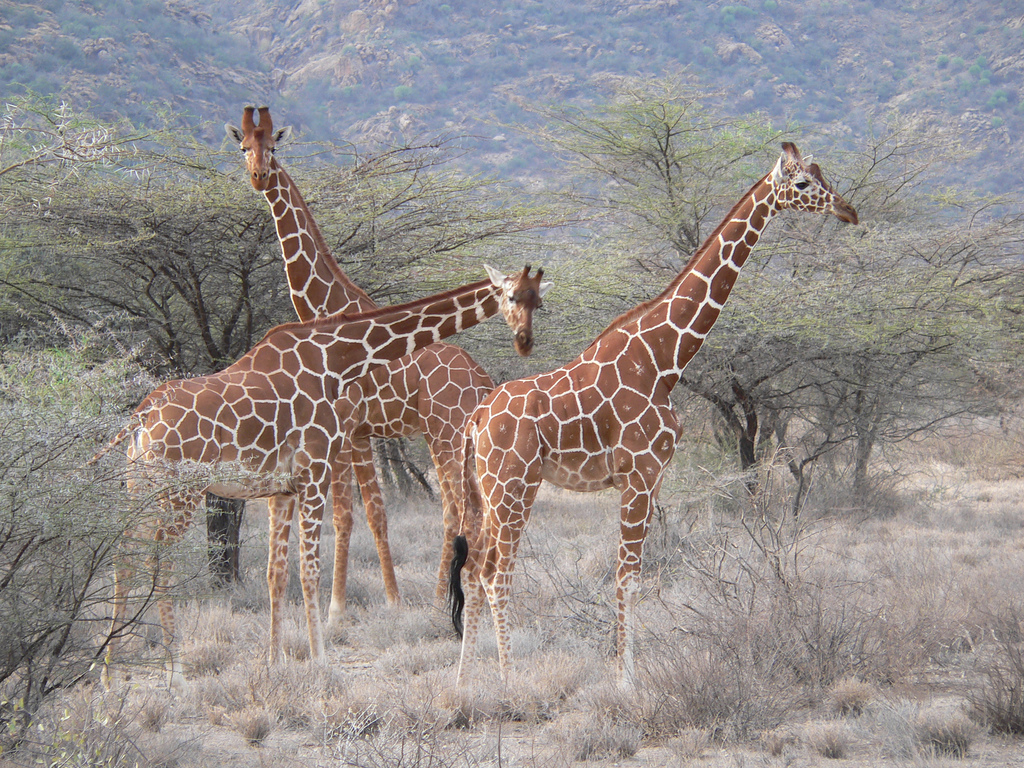
Reticulated giraffes at Samburu National Reserve, Kenya

Reticulated giraffes historically occurred widely throughout Northeast Africa. Their favored habitats are acacia-dotted savannas, arid woodlands, seasonal floodplains, as well as semi-deserts, steppes and open forest. Today, they are most commonly found within Kenya, in parks such as Meru National Park, Samburu National Reserve, and generally around the northern side of Mount Kenya. Additionally, they have been observed as far as Habaswein, Mnazini and Wajir, as well as in Tsavo East National Park.

== Ecology ==
Reticulated giraffes are diel, meaning they are active during the day and the night. They are most active during the early and late parts of the day, such as dawn, dusk and midnight, due to their warmer environment, a habit that may also be described as crepuscular. Their sleep patterns are usually short, consisting of no more than a couple hours at a time typically standing up. The home range of a G. reticulata is nonexclusive and usually overlapping with other individuals or groups. These home ranges include both males and females and vary in size depending on food resources, gender, and water availability. There is no evidence of territorial behavior between G. reticulata.

== Diet and foraging habits ==
The reticulated giraffe is a herbivore feeding on leaves, shoots, and shrubs. Their blue tongue, up to 30 centimeters (12 in) long, is used to strip the branches of acacia trees, their primary food source. They spend most of their day feeding, roughly 13 hours/day, eating up to 34 kilograms (75 lb) of food per day. They are ruminant mammals, also known as foregut fermentation, which complements their high fiber diet. The only competition for food resources G. reticulata encounters is elephants (Proboscidea).

== Social behavior ==
Reticulated giraffes can typically be seen in groups of 3–9, but there are instances of lone individuals. Kinship between females typically drives a group. These groups are often mother-child groups. Females are known to share protection of other young during predation.

== Reproduction ==
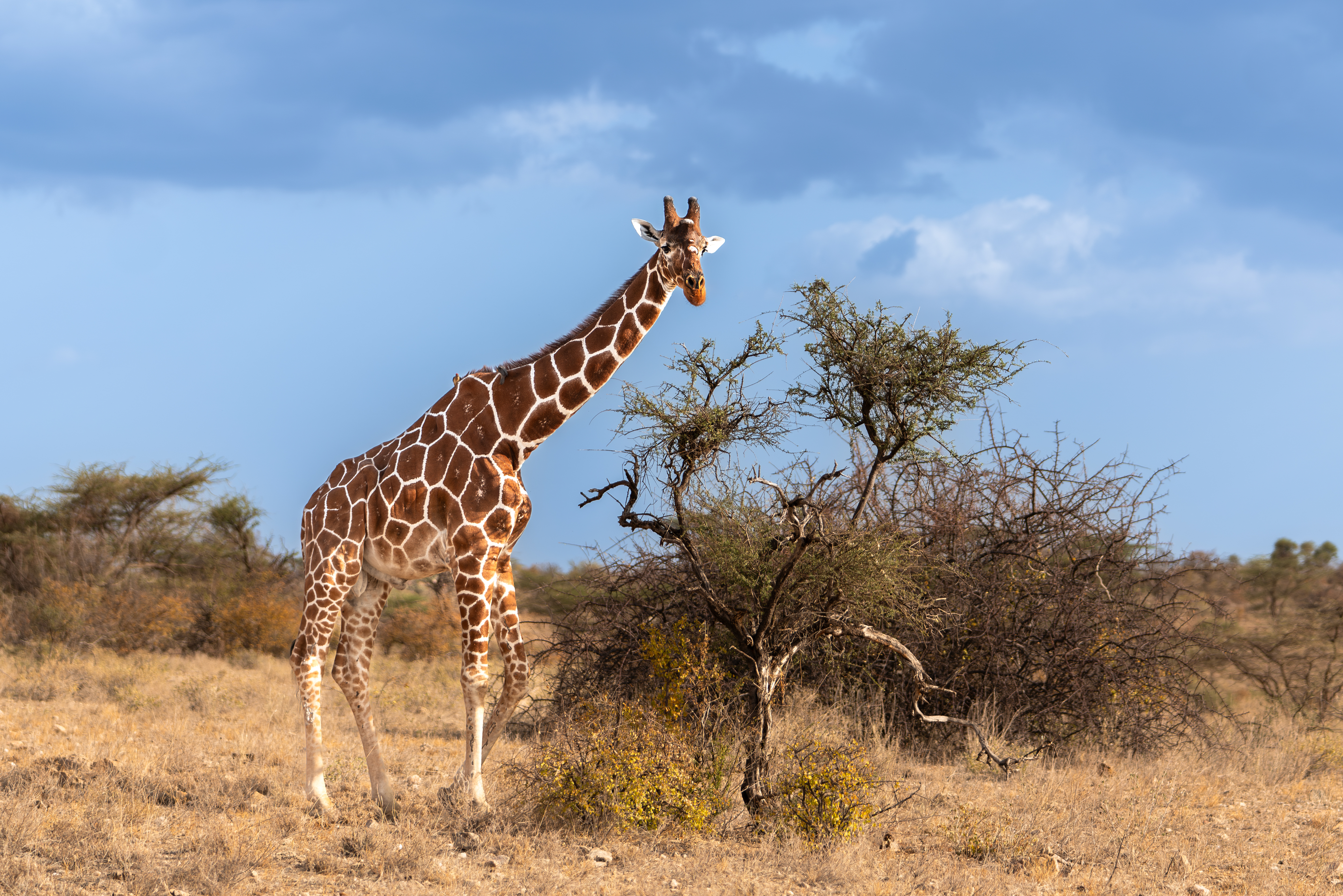
Giraffa reticulata

Females display reproductive receptivity by emitting odor from their vaginal area and hindparts. The estrous cycle of a female is about 15 days. A male can enhance this scent by curling its lip which assists in bringing the odor to the vomeronasal organ of the giraffe. Dominant males will guard estrus females from other competing males. When the male is ready to breed, he notifies the female by tapping the female's hindleg with his foreleg or by resting his head on the females back. Post-reproduction there is no long term bond between males and females. The gestation period of G. reticulata is on average 146.6 to 15 months, producing one offspring. The occasion of producing two offspring is rare but documented. The female will give birth standing up, and the offspring will stand up anywhere between 5–20 minutes post-birth. Weaning age of the young varies anywhere between 6–17 months, and independence occurs at 2 years old.

== Conservation ==
VOA report about conservation of the species

To save the remaining 9,000 or so reticulated giraffes, several conservation organizations have been formed. One of these organizations is San Diego Zoo Global's "Twiga Walinzi" (meaning Giraffe Guards) initiative. Their work includes hiring and training local Kenyans to monitor 120 trail cameras in Northern Kenya (Loisaba Conservancy and Namunyak Wildlife Conservancy) that capture footage of wild giraffes and other Kenyan wildlife; developing a photo ID database so individual giraffes can be tracked; informing rangers of poaching incidents and removing snares; caring for orphaned giraffes; and educating communities about giraffe conservation. Their numbers remain stable within reserves.

== In captivity ==
Along with the Rothschild's and the Masai giraffe, the Reticulated giraffe is among the most-commonly seen in zoos. The Cheyenne Mountain Zoo in Colorado Springs, Colorado is said to have the largest reticulated giraffe herd in North America. Reticulated and Rothschild's giraffes have been bred together in the past. This was done because it was thought that the giraffe subspecies interbred in the wild. However, research published in 2016 found that they do not. Nevertheless, some zoos are still interbreeding them.

Few zoos or parks keep distinct, separate herds of Masai, Rothschild's and Reticulated giraffes; all three can be seen at the San Diego Zoo (California) and its second facility, the San Diego Zoo Safari Park, while the Bronx Zoo (New York), Wildlife Safari (Oregon) and the UK's Chester Zoo have solely Rothschild's giraffes. The Cheyenne Mountain Zoo (Colorado), Busch Gardens Tampa (Florida), the Maryland Zoo (Baltimore), Omaha's Henry Doorly Zoo (Nebraska), the Louisville Zoo (Kentucky) and the Binder Park Zoo (Michigan) have solely Reticulated giraffes.

== In popular culture ==
The Madagascar trilogy by DreamWorks Animation features a reticulated giraffe named Melman voiced by David Schwimmer. In the sequel Madagascar: Escape 2 Africa and Madly Madagascar, they also feature other reticulated giraffes that resemble Melman.
