= Ibrahim A. Saney =

Kenyan politician

Ibrahim Abdi Saney is the current Member of Parliament for Wajir North Constituency. He won the general election of March 2013, slightly defeating his opponent Dr. Abdullahi of KANU. He was born and brought up In Korondille town of Buna District, Wajir County.

He studied in Kondillle Primary School then proceeded to Wajir High school. He graduated with bachelor's degree in Natural Resource from Egerton University in Kenya. Before joining politics in 2012, he was the CEO of a local Community Based Organization in Wajir.
