= Burder Ward =

- Location within Kenya
- Coordinates: 1.1896941027528707°N 40.451342268853345°E
- Country: Kenya
- County: Wajir County
- Highest elevation: 460 m (1,510 ft)
- Lowest elevation: 150 m (490 ft)
- Time zone: UTC+3 (EAT)

Burder Ward is an electoral ward of Wajir South Constituency in Wajir County Kenya. Burder Ward is one of the seven wards in Wajir South Constituency of Wajir County. The Ward suffers from severe neglect, underdevelopment, and a lack of progress since its creation. A mega failure by both successive Members of Parliament and the county governments. Despite the billions of devolved funds pumped into Wajir County over the years, water remains a scarce resource for the residents of the ward. The main water source for the residents for both domestic and livestock is water pans, which dry up during the dry season. The Ward has over 18 settlements and locations.

Burder ward lies between latitudes 1◦ 30’N and 0◦ 60’N and between longitudes 39◦ 30’E and 41◦ E. It borders Dif ward to the East; Lagboqol south to the South, and Ibrahim ure ward to the North. Burder ward is a featureless plain and lies between 150 meters and 460 meters above sea level and along latitude 1°45'N and longitude 40°4'E. Its altitude is 244 m (801 ft).

The region's population is largely pastoralist and pre-dominantly Somali. About 80-90% of the people depend largely on livestock for their livelihood. The main form of land use is nomadic pastoralism, which is the most efficient method of exploiting the range lands.

== Members of County Assembly ==
Elections	MCA	Party	Notes
2013	Adan Kadid	ODM	Orange Democratic Movement
2017	Abdullahi Akhwan	JP	Jubilee Party
2022	Abdirashid Hussein (Tajir)	UDA	United Democratic Alliance
