= Mohamed Adan Khalif =

Governor of Mandera county

Mohamed Adan Khalif محمد آدم خليف

2nd Governor Mandera County
- Incumbent
- Assumed office 25 August 2022
- Preceded by: Ali Roba
- In office 16 September 2013 – 24 August 2022

Former speaker Mandera
- In office 4 October 2017 – 20 September 2022

Former Mayor & councillor Mandera Town
- In office 1998–2014

Personal details
- Born: 29 November 1970 (age 55) Mandera, Kenya
- Party: United Democratic Movement (Kenya) (2022–present)

Mohamed Adan Khalif current Governor of Mandera county, was former Speaker of the Mandera County Assembly who served as Mandera Township councillor (1998–2013), former Mayor Mandera Town Council and as chairman of the local town council.

== Career ==
Mohamed previously served as the speaker of mandera county assembly, He also manages frontier company.

In 2022 Former mandera gubernatorial candidate Hassan nour Hassan (Moses) in one of the rally in Banissa Sub-County described mohamed As Qampar Mumuga.

== See also ==
- https://mak2022.co.ke/
- Mandera County Government
