= Abass Sheikh Mohamed =

Kenyan politician

Abass Sheikh Mohamed (born 1958 in Wajir) is a Kenyan politician currently serving as a senator for the Wajir County elected on the ticket of United Democratic Movement (UDM) in 2022. He was previously a member of the 11th parliament of Kenya from Wajir East Constituency in Wajir County. He was elected on the ticket of the United Republican Party (URP) with the support of Jubilee Coalition in 2013.

== Education and career ==
Abass Mohamed attended Wajir Primary School and Mandera High School before proceeding to Egerton University where he earned a diploma in range management and a degree in natural resource management. He holds a post-graduate diploma in sustainable local economic development and an MBA in strategic marketing from Erasmus University in the Netherland. Mohamed is the CEO of Kenya Livestock Marketing Council (KLMC).

He was elected to the 11th national assembly of Kenya in 2013 on the ticket of URP and with support of Jubilee Coalition. In the parliament, he served on the house committee on Defense and Foreign Relations. He lost reelection to Rashid Kassim Amiin in 2017. He was elected to the senate in 2022 on the ticket of UDM scoring 36, 201 votes to defeat his challenger Shallow Abdullahi Yahya who polled 33,580.
