= Rhamu Airport =

- IATA: HKOB; ICAO: none

Summary
- Airport type: Public, civilian
- Owner: Kenya Civil Aviation Authority
- Serves: Rhamu, Kenya
- Location: Mandera County
- Elevation AMSL: 805 ft (245 m)
- Coordinates: 03°55′33″N 41°13′28″E

Map
- Location of Rhamu Airport in Kenya; Placement on map is approximate

Runways
Direction	Length		Surface
Direction	ft	m	Surface
04/22	3,284	1,001	Asphalt

Rhamu Airport (IATA: HKOB, ICAO: none) is an airport in Kenya.

== Location ==
The airport is located in the town of Rhamu, in Madera County, close to the international border with Ethiopia, approximately 904 kilometres (562 mi), by air, north of Moi International Airport, in Mombasa, the nearest large civilian airport. This is approximately 755 kilometres (469 mi), by air, northeast of Jomo Kenyatta International Airport in Nairobi, the largest civilian airport in the country. The coordinates of Rhamu Airport are:3°55'33.0"N, 41°13'28.0"E (Latitude:3.925829; Longitude:41.224440).

== Overview ==
This is a civilian airport. It has a single paved runway at position 04/22, and lies at an elevation of 805 feet (245 m), above sea level. The runway measures 3,284 feet (1,001 m).

== See also ==
- Rhamu
- Kenya Civil Aviation Authority
- List of airports in Kenya
