= Tarbaj =

- Country: Kenya
- County: Wajir County

Population (2019)
  - Total: 57,232
- Time zone: UTC+3 (EAT)

Tarbaj town is the headquarters of the larger Tarbaj constituency and one of the Sub-Counties in Kenya's Wajir County.

== History ==
Tarbaj is a small remote uncultivated desert town in the Wajir County of Kenya, located near the Somali border. However, in recent times, the town has increasingly developed into a resource hub of online learning as a gap of education in Africa.
