= Bur Mayo =

- Location within Kenya
- Coordinates: 2.98°N 40.27°E
- Country: Kenya
- County: Mandera County
- Time zone: UTC+3 (EAT)

Bur Mayo is a settlement in Kenya's Mandera County.
