= Wajir South Constituency =

Kenyan electoral constituency

Wajir South
- constituency for the Parliament of Kenya
- Wajir South Constituency within Wajir County

- Wajir County within Kenya
- County: Wajir
- Population: 215,628
- Area: 21,595.7 km^{2} (8,338.1 sq mi)

Current constituency
- Number of members: 1
- Party: ODM
- Member of Parliament: Mohamed Adow
- Wards: 7

Wajir South Constituency is an electoral constituency in Kenya. Wajir South is one of the six constituencies in Wajir County and one of the largest in Kenya. It is also one of the most neglected, underdeveloped, and unchanged constituencies in Kenya since its creation. The constituency IEBC data shows Wajir South land mass is about 21,595.7 km², hence larger than Central (11,449), Nairobi (696) and Western (7,400) regions combined. The constituency has seven wards Burder Ward, Dadajabula, Ibrahim ure, Diif, Lagboqol south, Habaswein, and Banane ward, all electing Members of County Assembly (MCA) to the Wajir County Assembly.

On 27 September 2023, leaders from Wajir South Constituency led by area Mp Mr. Mohamed Adow submitted a memorandum proposing the creation of Wajir South County to the National Dialogue Committee at the Bomas of Kenya in Nairobi. This was sparked by the inequitable distribution of Wajir County resources and allocation of county jobs with Wajir South getting a paltry 5.33% and 4.19% respectively despite accounting 40% of Wajir County.

Wajir South Constituency lies between latitudes 1◦ 30’N and 0◦ 60’N and between longitudes 39◦ 30’E and 41◦ E. It borders Somalia Republic to the East; Lagdera Constituency to the South, Wajir West Constituency to the west, and Wajir East Constituency to the North.

Wajir South Constituency is a featureless plain and lies between 150 meters and 460 meters above sea level and along latitude 1°45'N and longitude 40°4'E. Its altitude is 244 m (801ft).

The region’s population is largely agro- pastoralist and pre-dominantly Somali. About 60-70% of the people depend largely on livestock for their livelihood. The main form of land use is nomadic pastoralism, which is the most efficient method of exploiting the range lands.

== Members of Parliament ==
Elections	MP	Party	Notes
1963	Ahmed Abdi Ogle	KANU	One-party system
1969	Abdi Ali Hirsi	KANU	One-party system
1974	Ahmed Abdi Ogle	KANU	One-party system
1979	Abdi Ali Hirsi	KANU	One-party system
1983	Ahmed Abdi Ogle	KANU	One-party system
1988	Noor Abdi Ogle	KANU	One-party system
1992	Arale Hassan Ahmed	KANU	Multi-party system
1997	Mohamed Abdi Affey	KANU	Multi-party system
2002	Abdirahman Ali Hassan	KANU	Multi-party system
2007	Abdirahman Ali Hassan	KANU	Multi-party system
2010	Mohamud M. Sirat (DAYOW)	ODM-K	Multi-party system
2013	Abdullahi M. Diriye (DAKALOW)	ODM	Multi-party system
2017	Mohamud Oomar	JP	Multi-party system
2022	Mohamed Adow	ODM	Multi-party system

== Wards ==
Wards
Ward	Registered Voters
Benane Ward	8,761
Burder Ward	6,980
Dif	11,570
Habaswein	9,970
Ibrahim Ure	7,564
Lagboghol South	8,925
Dadajabula	6,567
Total	63,337
*February 2025.
