= El Ben =

- Location within Kenya
- Coordinates: 2.32°N 40.2°E
- Country: Kenya
- County: Wajir County
- Time zone: UTC+3 (EAT)

El Ben is a settlement in Kenya's Wajir County.
