= War Dirsame =

- Location within Kenya
- Coordinates: 0.78°N 40.94°E
- Country: Kenya
- County: Wajir County
- Time zone: UTC+3 (EAT)

War Dirsame is a settlement in Kenya's Wajir County.
