= Ijara Constituency =

Kenyan electoral constituency

Ijara
- constituency for the Parliament of Kenya
- Ijara Constituency within Garissa County

- Garissa County within Kenya
- County: Garissa
- Population: 141,591
- Area: 2,453 km^{2} (947.1 sq mi)

Current constituency
- Number of members: 1
- Party: NAP K
- Member of Parliament: Abdi Ali Sheikhow
- Wards: 4

Ijara Constituency(Formerly Garissa south) is an electoral constituency in Kenya. It is one of six constituencies in Garissa County. It was the sole constituency in the former Ijara District. The constituency has seven wards, all electing ward representatives for the Garissa County Assembly.

== Members of Parliament ==
Elections	MP	Party	Notes
1988	Nasir Maalim Arte	KANU	One-party system.
1992	Nasir Maalim Arte	KANU	
1997	Mohamed Dahir Werah	KANU	
2002	Yusuf Mohamed Haji	KANU	
2007	Yusuf Mohamed Haji	KANU	
2013	Ibrahim Abass	ODM	
2017	Sophia Abdi Noor	JP	
2022	Abdi Ali Abdi	NAP	

== Wards ==
Wards
Ward	Registered Voters
Ijara	2,165
Korisa	1,583
Kotile	833
Masalani	2,163
Sangailu	1,044
Total	10,373
*September 2005.
