= Somalis in Kenya =

Kenyan citizens and residents of Somali descent

Kenyan Somalis
Soomaalida keenya (Somali) Msomali wa Kenya (Swahili)
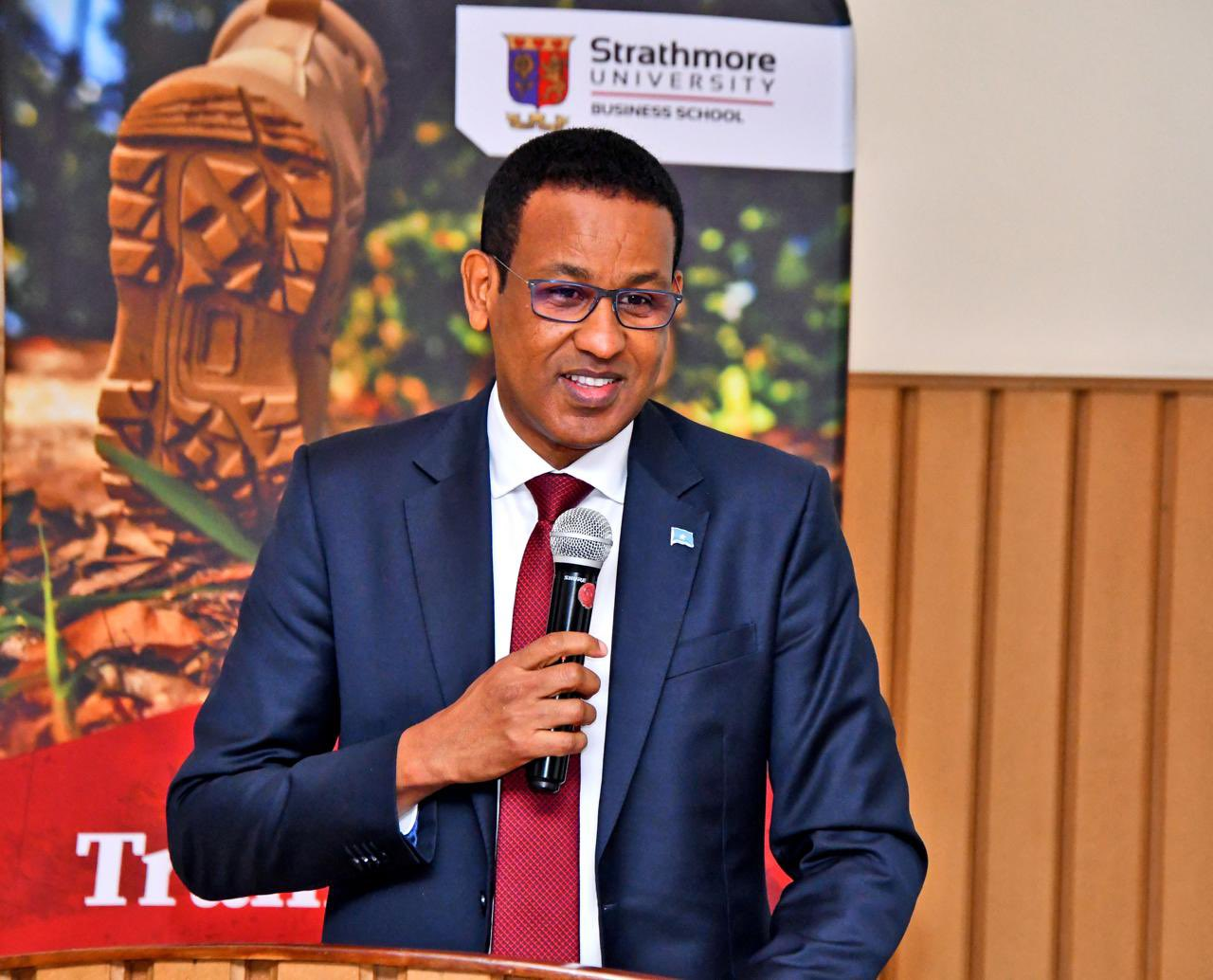
- Ambassador of Somalia to Kenya Jabril Abdulle

Total population
- 2,780,502 (2019 census)

Regions with significant populations
- North Eastern Province · Nairobi · Mombasa

Languages
- Somali (mother tongue); English, Swahili (working languages)

Religion
- Majority: Islam

Related ethnic groups
- Rendille • Oromo • other Cushitic peoples

Kenyan Somalis are citizens and residents of Kenya who are of Somali ethnic descent. They are the 6th largest ethnic group, and have historically inhabited the North Eastern Province, previously part of the Northern Frontier District, from which was carved out of the Jubaland region of present-day southern Somalia during the colonial period. Following the civil war in Somalia that broke out in 1991, many Somalis sought refuge in these Somali-inhabited areas in northeastern Kenya. As an entrepreneurial community, they established themselves in the business sector, particularly in the Nairobi suburb of Eastleigh.

== Population ==
Somalis in Kenya predominantly live in the North Eastern Province, specifically in the counties of Mandera, Wajir, Garissa, and Tana River, which border Somalia. These areas have historically been home to ethnic Somalis, who are native to the region and form a significant part of the population. Additionally, many Somalis reside in urban centers, particularly in Nairobi’s Eastleigh suburb, a major hub for Somali businesses and culture. Significant Somali populations are also found in Mombasa, Nakuru, and along the Kenyan coast, with smaller communities in other urban areas. According to the 2019 Kenya census, approximately 2,780,502 ethnic Somalis live in Kenya.

== History ==
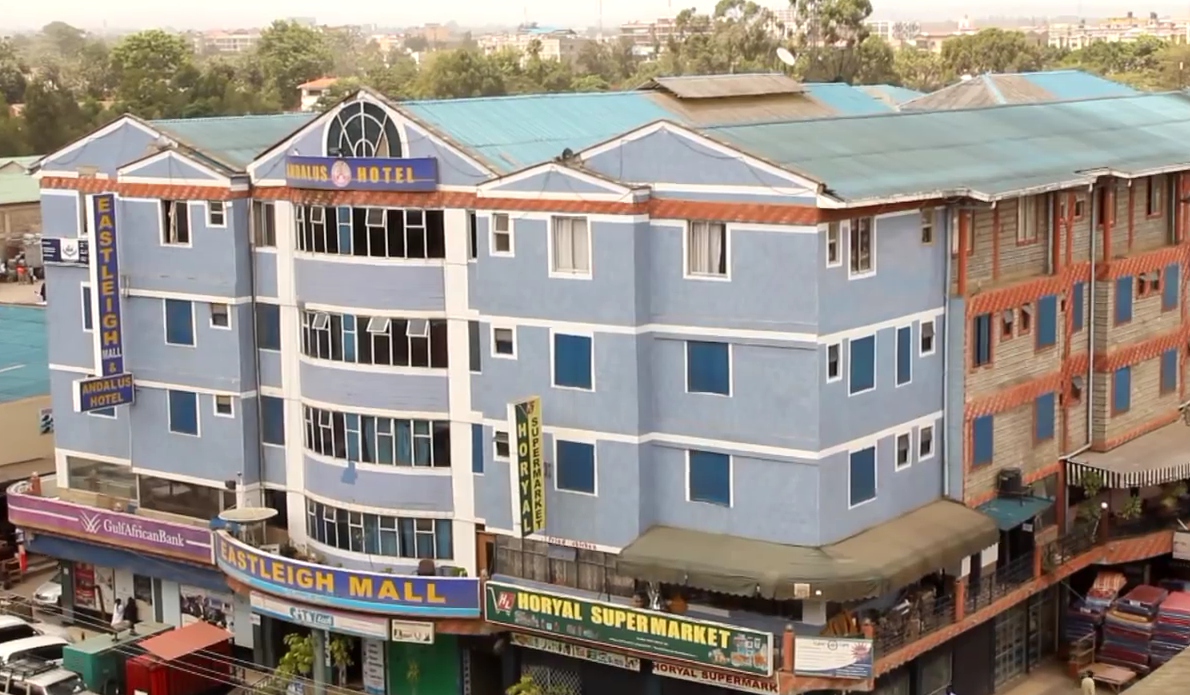
Somali-owned businesses in Eastleigh, Nairobi

As Eastern Cushites, Somalis trace their origins to ancient Cushitic populations that emerged in the Horn of Africa thousands of years ago. Archaeological and linguistic evidence suggests Cushitic groups, which included proto-Somali populations were present in the regions of Azania and Barbaria by the 1st millennium BCE, engaging in pastoralism and trade. Caravans from the interior loaded with exotic animal skins and ivory were brought to the ancient Somali city-states, and subsequently exported to Mediterranean and Asian markets.

By the early 10th century CE, Somalis began to expand across the Horn, driven by proselytism, exploration and trade networks along the Indian Ocean coast. Their presence in northern Kenya, particularly in areas like Wajir, Mandera, and Garissa, likely solidified during this period as they moved southward from the Somali peninsula. These areas were part of their traditional grazing lands, with no fixed borders at the time.

During the pre-colonial period, prior to the 19th century, Somali clans such as the Darod, Hawiye, and Garre, established themselves in the North Eastern Province of modern Kenya, coexisting with other Cushitic groups like the Borana and Rendille. They maintained a pastoralist lifestyle, herding camels, cattle, and goats, and were also deeply integrated into regional trade networks, including with the cities on the Swahili coast. For centuries Mogadishu and Zanzibar were trading considerably. Described as a maritime people with pastoral habits, they also occupied a separate quarter in Mombasa.

As such, they have historically inhabited the North Eastern Province, formerly known as the Northern Frontier District (NFD) which also included the present day Borana and Gabra inhabited Marsabit and Isiolo counties. During colonialism, the NFD region covered the northern parts of East Africa Protectorate later succeeded by British Kenya. It also included half of the Jubaland province that remained part of Kenya when the other half was ceded to the Italian Empire as Oltre Giuba. Whilst being under British colonial administration, the northern half of Jubaland was ceded to Italy as a reward for the Italians' support of the Allies during World War I. Britain retained control of the southern half of the territory.

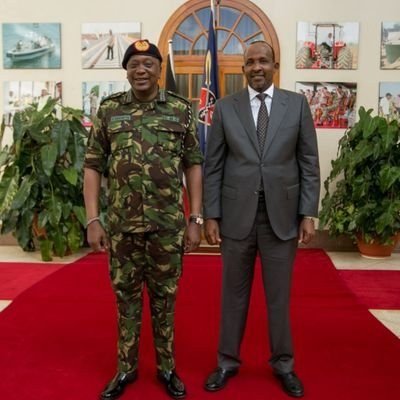
Aden Duale, a Kenyan ethnic Somali, previously served as majority leader in the National Assembly and current Minister of Defence of Kenya

On 26 June 1960, four days before granting Somalia independence, the British government declared that all Somali-inhabited areas of East Africa be unified as one administrative region. However, after the dissolution of the former British colonies in the region, Britain eventually granted administration of the Northern Frontier District to Kenyan nationalists. This was despite a 1962 commission report showing 86% of the Somalis in Kenya favouring secession and joining the newly formed Somali Republic as they made up the majority in the North Eastern section. Nonetheless, the Somali residents had by then successfully lobbied for a separate classification from the adjacent Bantu and Nilotic populations. In the 1962 British Kenya census, the populous Somalis were accorded their own "Somali" entry separate from the "African", "Arab", "Asian" and "European" designations.

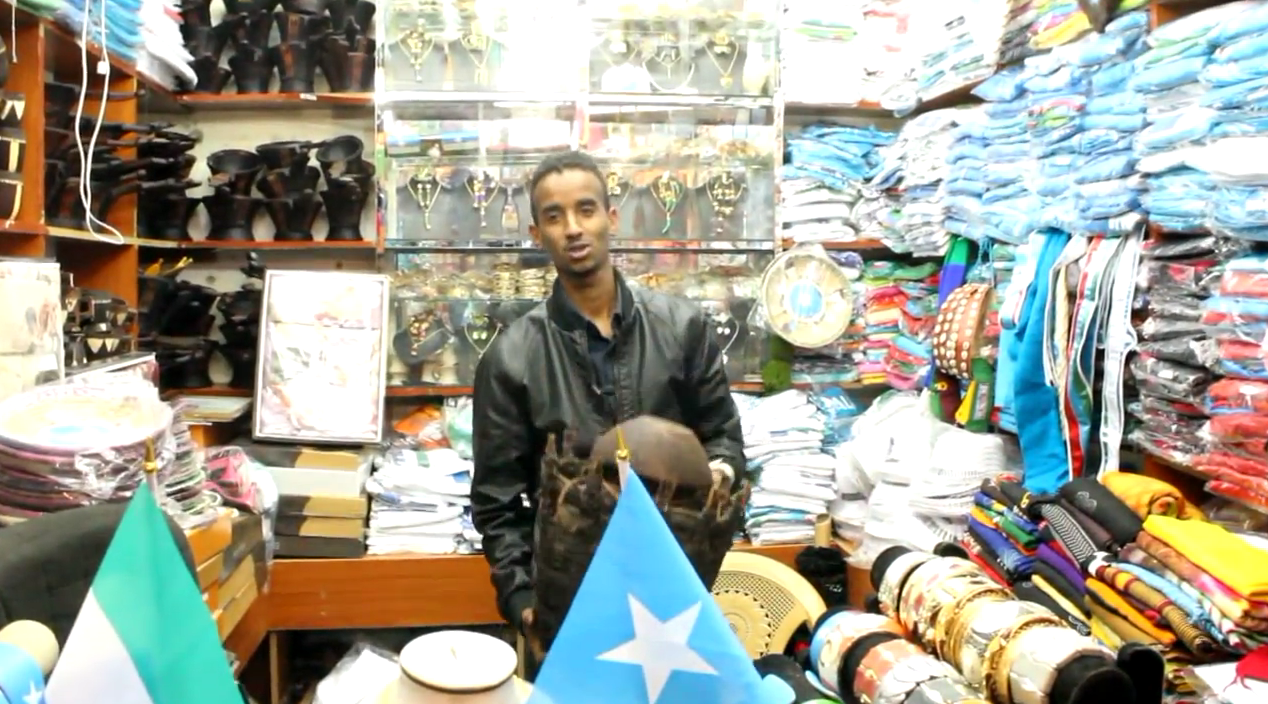
A Somali store owner

On the eve of Kenya's independence in August 1963, British officials belatedly realized that the new Kenyan regime was not willing to give up the Somali-inhabited areas it had just been granted administration of. Led by the Northern Province People's Progressive Party (NPPPP), Somalis in the NFD vigorously sought union with their kin in the Somali Republic to the north. In response, the Kenyan government enacted a number of repressive measures designed to frustrate their efforts in what came to be known as the Shifta War. Many Somalis advocated for a Greater Somalia. Proponents of Pan-Somali nationalism sought to incorporate all Somalis living in British Somaliland, Italian Somaliland, French Somaliland, and contiguous territories in Ethiopia and Kenya into a single territorial nation-state. Although the conflict ended in a cease-fire, Somalis in the region still identify and maintain close ties with their brethren over in Somalia. Since they have traditionally practiced endogamy and marry only within their community, the Somalis in Kenya have formed a cohesive ethnic network.

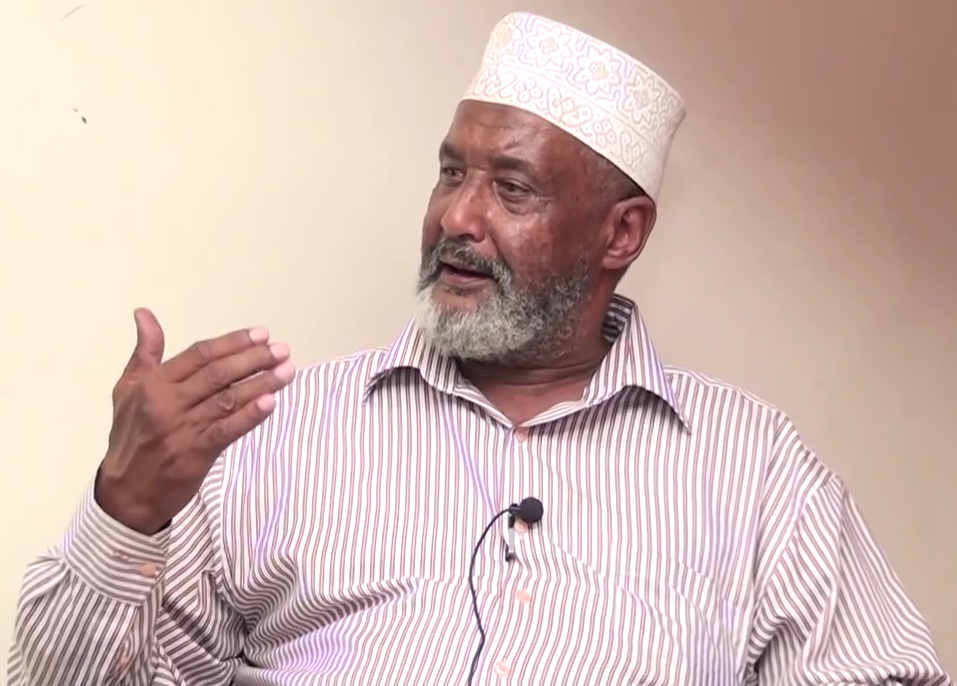
Somali entrepreneur Hussein Mohamed, Vice Chairman of the Eastleigh Business Association

Following the civil war in Somalia that broke out in 1991, many Somalis sought asylum in the Somali-inhabited regions of northeastern Kenya. An entrepreneurial community, they established themselves in the business sector, investing over $1.5 billion in Eastleigh alone. Starting in late 2012, a mass exodus of Somali residents was reported after a prolonged period of harassment by the Kenyan police and public. Hundreds of Somali entrepreneurs withdrew between Sh10 to Sh40 billion from their bank accounts, with the intention of reinvesting most of that money back home in Somalia. The collective departures most affected Eastleigh's real estate sector, as landlords struggled to find Kenyans able to afford the high rates of the apartments and shops vacated by the Somalis.

== See also ==
- Somali diaspora
