= Hara Hurile =

- Location within Kenya
- Coordinates: 4.05°N 40.27°E
- Country: Kenya
- County: Mandera County
- Time zone: UTC+3 (EAT)

Hara Hurile is a settlement in Mandera County, Kenya.
