= Mohamed Ibrahim Elmi =

Kenyan politician

Mohamed Ibrahim Elmi is a Kenyan politician. He belongs to the Orange Democratic Movement and was elected to represent the Wajir East Constituency (2007-2013) and Tarbaj Constituency (2013-2017) in the National Assembly of Kenya since the 2007 Kenyan parliamentary election.
