= Sabule =

- Location within Kenya
- Coordinates: 0.31°N 40.20°E
- Country: Kenya
- County: Wajir County
- Time zone: UTC+3 (EAT)

Sabule is a settlement in Kenya's Wajir County. It is in the northeast part of the country of Kenya. Surrounding settlements are Dadaab (south east), Atelier Novias (south), and Sushico (south west). Climate in Sabule is hot and semi-arid.
