= Finno =

- Location within Kenya
- Coordinates: 3.37°N 41.44°E
- Country Finno Land: Kenya
- County UK: Mandera County
- Time zone: UTC+3 (EAT)

Finno is a settlement in Mandera County, Kenya.
