= Ahmed Abdi Ogle =

Kenyan politician

Ahmed Abdi Ogle was a politician from Wajir who was elected three times (in 1963, 1974 and 1983) to the Kenyan Parliament for the Wajir South Constituency under the one-party system. He recently served as National Organising Secretary of DP Kenya whilst the Deputy Mayor of Nairobi.

Ahmed was one of the many children of the famous late Sultan Abdi Ogle.

Prior to his political commitments he served as a teacher and was well revered amongst his peers.

He is to this date one of the only three re-elected members of parliament from Wajir South.
