= Wajir East Constituency =

Kenyan electoral constituency

Wajir East
- constituency for the Parliament of Kenya
- Wajir East Constituency within Wajir County

- Wajir County within Kenya
- County: Wajir
- Population: 110,654
- Area: 4,053 km^{2} (1,564.9 sq mi)

Current constituency
- Number of members: 1
- Party: JP
- Member of Parliament: Adan Mohamed Daud
- Wards: 4

Wajir East Constituency is an electoral constituency in Kenya. It is one of six constituencies in Wajir County. The constituency has 10 wards, all electing MCAs to the Wajir County Assembly. The constituency was established for the 1966 elections.

== Members of Parliament ==
| Elections | MP | Party | Notes |
|---|---|---|---|
| 1966 | Omar Abdi Abdullahi | KANU | One-party system |
| 1969 | A. S. Khalif | KANU | One-party system |
| 1970 | Diriye Mohamed Amin | KANU | By-election. One-party system |
| 1974 | Diriye Mohamed Amin | KANU | One-party system |
| 1979 | Mohamed Sheikh Abdi | KANU | One-party system |
| 1983 | Mohamed Sheikh Abdi | KANU | One-party system. |
| 1988 | Diriye Mohamed Amin | KANU | One-party system. |
| 1992 | Sheikh Mohamed Abdi | KANU | |
| 1997 | Mohamed Abdi Mohamud | KANU | |
| 2002 | Mohamed Abdi Mohamud | KANU | |
| 2007 | Mohamed Ibrahim Elmi | ODM | |
| 2013 | Abass Sheikh Mohamed | URP | |
| 2017 | Rashid Kassim Amin | WDM | |
| 2022 | Adan Daud Mohamed | JP | |

== Wards ==
Wards
| Ward | Registered Voters |
| Jogbaru | 2,119 |
| Khorof Harar | 1,526 |
| Township | 3,794 |
| Hothan | 2,794 |
| Wagberi | 4,645 |
| Wajir Bor | 1,468 |
| Wargadud | 2,030 |
| Total | 26,470 |
*September 2005.
