= Mohamed Maalim Mohamud =

Kenyan politician

Hon. (Amb) Mohamed Maalim Mohamud is a Kenyan politician who is a former Senator for Mandera County. He is also the Chairman of the Senate Finance and Budget Committee. From 2008 to 2011, he was the Assistant Minister (Electricity and Renewable Energy) in the Ministry of Energy. He belongs to the Jubilee Party. Mohamud has been Member of parliament for Mandera West Constituency from 2007 to 2013.

Mohamud is a member of the Institution of Engineers of Kenya, a registered engineer with the Engineers' Registration Board of Kenya, and an associate member of the Chartered Institute of Arbitrators. He holds a Bachelor of Science Kenya.
