= Banissa Constituency =

Banissa
- constituency
- Country: Kenya
- County: Mandera County

Banissa is a constituency in Kenya. It is one of six constituencies in Mandera County.

== MPs ==
Kulow Maalim Hassan represented it from 2017 until his death in March 2023 after being re-elected in the 2022 general elections. By 2024 the IEBC was yet to conduct a by-election to elect a new member of national assembly. By-election was scheduledfor 27th November 2025 between Nurudin Maalim Dalato and Ahmed Maalim Hassan. Ahmed Maalim Hassan won the by-election and was sworn in on 2 December 2025.
