= Mandera South Constituency =

Mandera South is a constituency in Mandera County, Kenya. It is one of six constituencies in Mandera County.

== Government ==
The current Deputy County Commissioner is Daniel Bundotich.
