= Ijara District =

Administrative district

Coordinates: 1°36′S 40°32′E

Ijara was a former administrative district in the North Eastern Province of Kenya. On May 20, 2000, it was carved out from the larger Garissa District. It covered an area of 11,332 km^{2} and, according to the population census of 1999, had a population of 62,571. It bordered Garissa District to the north, Lamu District to the south, Tana River District to the west, and Somalia to the northeast. The district had one local authority, Ijara county council, and one constituency, Ijara Constituency. In 2010, it was amalgamated with Garissa County.

The main economic livelihood of the inhabitants is pastoralism and subsistence agriculture. Over 80% of the land is earmarked for livestock production. There is potential for rain-fed agriculture but only a small proportion is utilized for commercial agriculture. Local communities settled in the district include the Awer hunter-gatherers and the pastoral Somali Abdalla.

Administrative divisions
Division	Population*	Pop. density*	Area (km^{2})	Headquarters
Hulugho	20,831	4	5207.8	
Ijara	29,236	7	2462.3	Ijara
Masalani	17358	9	1484.2	Masalani
Sangailu	11,217	5	2243.4	
Total	62,624	-	11,397	-
* 1999 census. Sources:

== Nature ==
Approximately one quarter of the former district is covered by the Boni Forest, which is an indigenous open canopy forest and part of Northern Zanzibar-Inhambane coastal forest mosaic. A section of the forest, the Boni National Reserve, is managed by the Kenya Wildlife Service as a protected conservation area. Other forest types are found along the Tana River on the western border of the district. The district is also pivotal in the conservation of the critically endangered Hirola population. A number of initiatives and conservancies have been established to that purpose, including the Ishaqbini Hirola Conservancy.
