= Abdirahman Ali Hassan =

Kenyan politician

Abdirahman Ali Hassan is a Kenyan politician. He served in the government of Kenya as assistant minister for trade and industry from 2005 to 2007. A member of the Orange Democratic Movement, He was elected to represent the Wajir South Constituency in the National Assembly of Kenya in the Kenyan 2002 parliamentary election. He was a Member of Parliament when Eldas Constituency and Garissa Township Constituency was created in Wajir County, He was also elected to the senate of Kenya in 2013, representing Wajir county, and becoming deputy minority leader in the senate.

== Early life ==
Abdirahman went to Wajir primary school, Wajir high school, before being admitted to the university of Nairobi, where he graduated with a Bachelor of developmental studies. He was the director and programme coordinator oxfam GB in Kenya, from 1998, stepping down when he became Kenya's member of parliament.

== Politics ==
In the 1997 Kenyan general election, Abdirahman contested the Wajir South Constituency parliamentary seat, but lost it. In the election, Abdirahman again contested Wajir South. He won the seat, which he held until 2010, becoming the first person to hold the seat two consecutive terms. During his term, he wascredited with the building of 10 schools to increase primary and high school enrollment in the region. He also implemented a major water projects for the Wajir south people during his term and introduced innovative clinics to decrease infant mortality.
