= Adan Nooru =

Kenyan politician

Hon. Adan Mohamed Nooru

Member of the East African Legislative Assembly

Member of the Kenyan Parliament for Mandera North Constituency
- In office 1983–2002
- Preceded by: Position established
- Succeeded by: Adan Kerrow Billow
- In office 2013–2017
- Preceded by: Abdikadir Hussein Mohamed
- Succeeded by: Bashir Abdullaih

Personal details
- Party: URP (2013–2017); KANU (1983–2002)
- Other political affiliations: Jubilee Coalition
- Profession: Politician

Adan Mohamed Nooru is a Kenyan politician and member of the Kenyan and East African Legislative Assembly. He was first elected to the parliament from Mandera North Constituency during the one- party system in Kenya in 1983 and served as an assistant minister under the Kenya African National Union (KANU) government.

== Political career ==
Adan Nooru was elected to the parliament 1983 on the ticket of KANU party for the Mandera North Constituency and served until 2002 when he lost reelection to Adan Kerrow Billow. He attempted to reclaim the seat in 2007 but was defeated by Abdikadir Hussein Mohamed of the Safina Party. He successfully reclaimed the seat in the 2013 parliamentary election on the ticket of URP with the support of Jubilee Coalition. He chaired the house committee on Agriculture, Livestock and Co-operatives and was member of Public Investment committee in the 11th parliament.
