= Lafey Constituency =

Coordinates: 3°55′N 41°50′E

Lafey
- constituency for the Parliament of Kenya
- Lafey Constituency within Mandera County

- Mandera County within Kenya
- County: Mandera
- Population: 83,457
- Area: 3,795 km^{2} (1,465.3 sq mi)

Current constituency
- Number of members: 1
- Party: JP
- Member of Parliament: Mohamed Abdi Abdirahman
- Wards: 5

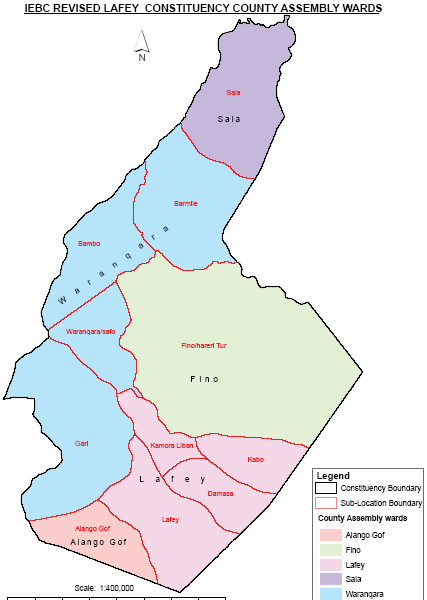

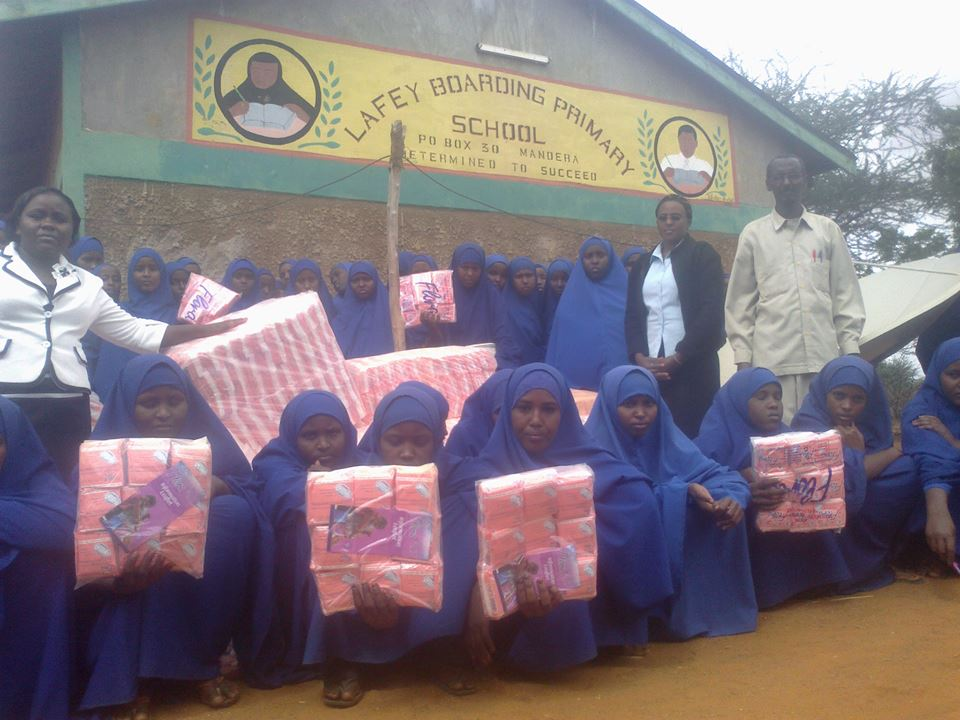
Lafey primary school

Lafey Constituency is a constituency in Mandera County, Kenya. It is one of six constituencies in the county. The town of Lafey is the capital of the constituency, and is located near the border with Somalia.
