= Kulow Maalim Hassan =

Kenyan politician

Kulow Maalim Hassan (died 28 March 2023) was a Kenyan politician from the United Democratic Movement (UDM). In 2017 and 2022 he was elected Member of Parliament for Banissa Constituency.

== Death ==
He was killed in a hit and run incident in Nairobi.

== See also ==
- 12th Parliament of Kenya
- 13th Parliament of Kenya
