= Mandera West Constituency =

Electoral constituency in Kenya

Mandera West
- constituency for the Parliament of Kenya
- Mandera West Constituency within Mandera County

- Mandera County within Kenya
- County: Mandera
- Population: 98,300
- Area: 4,018 km^{2} (1,551.4 sq mi)

Current constituency
- Number of members: 1
- Party: UDM
- Member of Parliament: Adan Haji Yussuf
- Wards: 5

Mandera West Constituency is an electoral constituency in Kenya that was established for the 1966 elections. It is one of six constituencies in Mandera County. It has five wards, all electing councillors to the Mandera County Assembly.

== Wards ==
According to the 2009 census: 1. Takaba South Ward

County Assembly Ward No.: 0191 County Assembly Ward Name: Takaba south County Assembly Ward Population (Approx.): 42,557 County Assembly Ward Area In Sq. km (Approx.): 1,725.20 County Assembly Ward Description: Comprises Wangai Dahan, Duduble, Bolowle and Didkuro Sub–Locations of Mandera County County Members of Assembly: Hon. Hussein Adan Haji (HAJI HUSKA) (2017–2022)

Personal details: Hon.CPA.Hussein Adan Haji, Born. 20 July 1989, Mandera, Kenya. Professional; CPSK, HRM, ICPAK, finance, Accounts and Audit. Highest Education level. PHD(UON) student. Protectorate (Kenya). Political party Economic Freedom Party(EFP). Spouse(s) Meymuna Kala,

2. Takaba Ward

County Assembly Ward No.: 0192 County Assembly Ward Name: Takaba County Assembly Ward Population (Approx.): 33,542 County Assembly Ward Area In Sq. km (Approx.): 435.80 County Assembly Ward Description: Comprises Takaba and Kubdishan Sub–Locations of Mandera County

3. Lagsure Ward

County Assembly Ward No.: 0193 County Assembly Ward Name: Lagsure County Assembly Ward Population (Approx.): 14,837 County Assembly Ward Area In Sq. km (Approx.): 982.50 County Assembly Ward Description: Comprises Lagsure Sub–Location of Mandera County

4. Dandu Ward

County Assembly Ward No.: 0194 County Assembly Ward Name: Dandu County Assembly Ward Population (Approx.): 37,494 County Assembly Ward Area In Sq. km (Approx.): 791.80 County Assembly Ward Description: comprises Dandu, El Danada Kubi Halo and Ilresteno Sub–Locations of Mandera County

5. Gither Ward

County Assembly Ward No.: 0195 County Assembly Ward Name: Gither County Assembly Ward Population (Approx.): 33,271 County Assembly Ward Area In Sq. km (Approx.): 652.00 County Assembly Ward Description: Comprises Gither and Sake Sub–Locations of Mandera County

== Members of Parliament ==
Elections	MP	Party	Notes
1966	Mohamed Nur Hussein	KANU	
1969	Ali Mohamed Sheikh	KANU	One-party system
1974	Ali Mohamed Sheikh	KANU	One-party system
1979	Ali Mohamed Sheikh	KANU	One-party system
1980	Ali Jaffar Sheikh Mohamed	KANU	By-election. One-party system.
1983	Ali Jaffar Mohamed Sheikh	KANU	One-party system.
1988	Seyid Mohamed Amin	KANU	One-party system.
1992	Adan Mohamed Abdillahi	KANU	
1997	Seyid Mohamed Amin	KANU	
2002	Abdi Haji Mohamed Mohamed	KANU	
2007	Mohamed Maalim Mohamud	ODM	
2013	Mohamed Maalim Mohamud	URP	
2017	Adan Haji Yussuf	Economic Freedom Party	

2022 Kenyan general election 2022 Adan Haji Yussuf United Democratic Movement (UDM)

== Wards ==
Wards
Ward	Registered voters
Banissa	5,110
Dandu	4,444
Derkale	1,614
Gither	5,730
Guba	1,054
Malkamari	2,210
Takaba North	4,101
Takaba South	11,765
Total	36,028
*September 2005.
