= Kutul =

Kutul Кутул
- Selo
- Location within Republic of Dagestan Location within Russia
- Coordinates: 41°32′N 47°57′E
- Country: Russia
- Region: Republic of Dagestan
- District: Kurakhsky District
- Time zone: UTC+3:00

Kutul (Russian: Кутул) is a rural locality (a selo) and the administrative centre of Kutulsky Selsoviet, Kurakhsky District, Republic of Dagestan, Russia. The population was 195 as of 2010.

== Geography ==
Kutul is located 18 km southeast of Kurakh (the district's administrative centre) by road. Ikra and Kabir are the nearest rural localities.

== Nationalities ==
Lezgins live there.
