= Khorof Harar =

- Country: Kenya
- County: Wajir County
- Time zone: UTC+3 (EAT)

Khorof Harar is a settlement in Kenya's Wajir County.

Khorof Harar people are mostly nomads and pastoralist people whose source of livelihood is from keeping of livestock. In northern Khorof Harar, 6 km away from the town, is a large dam owned by a resident, Ahmed Abdkirahmam Muhumed. The dam serves many nomads during and after the rainy seasons. The location of the dam is called LAGTA, Marehan Community is mostly populated there.

== Recent developments ==
In July 2022, at least 10 explosives were thrown at Khorof Harar police station by suspected Al-Shabaab militants, but missed their mark. Attacks across the ward started again in November 2022, the day before elections took place, in a likely attempt to suppress voter turnout.

In November 2023, the police station at Khorof Harar was flooded during heavy rains caused by El Niño.
