= Lafey =

- Town
- Location in Kenya
- Coordinates: 03°09′03″N 41°11′11″E
- Country: Kenya
- County: Mandera County

Population (2019)
  - Total: 83,457

Lafey is a town and sub-county in the Mandera County of Kenya. It sits in the northeast part of the country, at the international border with Somalia.

== Location ==
The town is approximately 51 kilometres (32 mi), north-east of Elwak, the nearest large town. This is approximately 118 kilometres (73 mi), by road, south-west of Mandera, the site of the district headquarters. Lafey is approximately 850 kilometres (528 mi), by road, north-east of Nairobi, the capital and largest city of Kenya. The coordinates of the town are 3°09'03.0"N, 41°11'11.0"E (Latitude:3.150838; Longitude:41.186401).

== Overview ==
Lafey is the headquarters of Lafey Constituency, in the Mandera county. It is represented by Hon Mohamed Abdikheyr in the Kenya National Assembly.

The town is between El Wak, Kenya and Mandera, a distance of about 170 kilometres (106 mi). The road through Lafey, which runs along the border with Somalia, is shorter and much traveled, but is less safe than the main road through Rhamu. Damasa Primary School is in the town of Damasa, along the Kenya Somalia border. Lafey is mainly inhabited by the murulle clan which is further divided other sub clans. Politics in the region is driven by tribal backgrounds thus affecting development of town. Some of its inhabitants are pastrolists who graze their livestock at the outskirts of the town.

== See also ==
- Mandera County
- Lafey Constituency
