= Tarbaj Constituency =

Electoral constituency in Kenya

Tarbaj
- constituency for the Parliament of Kenya
- Tarbaj Constituency within Wajir County

- Wajir County within Kenya
- County: Wajir
- Population: 57,232
- Area: 9,608 km^{2} (3,709.7 sq mi)

Current constituency
- Number of members: 1
- Party: UDA
- Member of Parliament: Hussein Abdi Barre
- Wards: 4

Tarbaj is a constituency in Kenya. It is one of the six constituencies in Wajir County.

Tarbaj is 9,608 km^{2} (3,710 mi^{2}) in size and has a population of 57,232 according to the 2019 census. There are 5 wards in the constituency: Elben, Sarman, Kutulo, Wargadud, and Tarbaj. The current MP is Hussein Abdi Barre, elected in 2022.

The Fai, a subclan of the Degodia, make up a large part of the constituency's electorate.
