= Ijara =

- Location in Kenya
- Coordinates: 1.598818°S 40.513544°E
- Country: Kenya
- County: Garissa County

Population (2019)
  - Total: 141,591
- Time zone: UTC+3 (EAT)

Ijara, Kenya

Ijara Health Centre, Kenya

Ijara is a town and Sub-County in Garissa County, Kenya. It was previously capital of the former Ijara District. It is located 100 km north of Lamu and 180 km south of Garissa.

== Alternate meanings ==
Ijara means rent in Arabic. Ijara (or Ijarah) is also a sharia-compliant form of mortgage similar to conventional rent-to-own. The process is also known as Ijara wa Iqtina, or rent with acquisition.
