= Dif =

- Location within Kenya
- Coordinates: 1°N 40.96°E
- Country: Kenya/Somalia
- Kenyan County: Wajir County
- Somali Region: Lower Juba
- Time zone: UTC+3 (EAT)

Dif is a settlement divided between Kenya's Wajir County and Somalia's Lower Juba region.

== Demographics ==
Dif is primarily and exclusively inhabited by the Ogaden, Darood clan and is home to the Mohamed Zubeer sub clan.
