= Wajir North Constituency =

Kenyan electoral constituency

Wajir North
- constituency for the Parliament of Kenya
- Wajir North Constituency within Wajir County

- Wajir County within Kenya
- County: Wajir
- Population: 62,206
- Area: 4,042 km^{2} (1,560.6 sq mi)

Current constituency
- Number of members: 1
- Party: UDA
- Member of Parliament: Ibrahim Abdi Saney
- Wards: 7

Wajir North Constituency is an electoral constituency in Kenya. It is one of six constituencies in Wajir County. The constituency has seven wards, all electing ward representatives to the Wajir County Assembly. The constituency was established for the 1997 elections.

In the 2007 elections two candidates (Ali Ibrahim of KANU and Mohammed Gabow of ODM) received the same number of votes and no winner could be declared. Consequently, a repeat election was held in 2008 between the two candidates.

== Members of Parliament ==
1. 1997: Hon. Dr. Abdillahi Ibrahim Ali, KANU General Elections

2. 2002: Hon. Dr.Abdillahi Ibrahim Ali, KANU General Elections

3. 2008: Hon. Mohammed Hussein Gabow, ODM By-election

4. 2013: Hon. Ibrahim A. Saney, ODM General Elections

5. 2017: Hon. Ahmed Abdisalan, ODM General Elections

6. 2022: Hon. Ibrahim A. Saney, UDA General Elections

=== Wards ===
Wards
Ward	Registered Voters		
Buna	6,667		
Bute	4236		
Godoma	4,867		
Gurar	4024		
Korondile	9,588		
Danada/Ajawa	6730		
Malka gufu	3871	Total	39,983
*September 2005.
