= Ali Roba =

First governor of Mandera County, Kenya

- Ibrahim Ali Roba

Senator
- Incumbent: 2022 - present

Personal details
- Education: University of Nairobi

Ibrahim Ali Roba, commonly known as Ali Roba is the first governor of Mandera County. He was elected on March 4, 2013 as the governor of Mandera on a United Republic Party (URP) ticket, a coalition member of Jubilee Party of Kenya. He was re-elected as governor for a second and final term on August 8, 2017. He now serves as the Senator of Mandera County after completing his second term as the Governor of Mandera County.

Since the beginning of 2008, when Ali Roba was appointed to the position of the Chief Pilot, he has contributed exceptionally to the overall compliance levels of DAC Aviation (EA) Ltd by playing instrumental roles in the achievement of an ‘A’ systems and operational audit rating by DAC Aviation International. Ali roba has played a major role in re-structuring of flight operations department and enhancing the efficiency of operational control functions to enviable levels within the general aviation industry in Kenya.

Once, Roba was attacked by militants were 4 people were killed, and he was injured; one of the deaths was in his convoy. In an interview with the Daily Nation, Mr Roba said he was on his way to the office from his home when the IED exploded.

The Kenya Medical Practitioners and Dentists Union and the Kenya National Teachers Union have advised their members to vacate the North Eastern region over insecurity.

== History ==
=== Education history ===
Graduated with a master's from the University of Nairobi (2009 to 2011). He graduated earlier as a Bachelor of Commerce. He also studied in Kenya Utalii College, Delta Qualiflight School of Aviation in Fort Worth, Texas, Kenya School of Flying among other institutions.

=== Job history ===
Ali Roba worked as an Operations Coordinator of Airkenya Express helping with crew coordination, ramp coordinations, line maintenance coordination, cabin crew coordination, customer relations, flight dispatch, flight operations planning.
