= Takaba, Kenya =

Takaba
- Town
- Location in Kenya
- Coordinates: 3.39632°N 40.22511°E
- Country: Kenya
- County: Mandera County

Population (2009)
  - Total: 21,474
- Time zone: UTC+3 (EAT)

Takaba is a town in Mandera County, in northeastern Kenya. According to the 2009 census, the town was the fourth most populous in the county with a population of 21,474. The town has a functional airstrip. The headquarters of Mandera West sub-county are located in Takaba.

Takaba is located approximately halfway between the major towns of Moyale and Mandera.
