= Abdikadir Hussein Mohamed =

Kenyan politician

Member of the National Assembly of Kenya
- In office 2007–2013
- Preceded by: Billow Kerrow
- Constituency: Mandera Central Constituency

Member of Parliament for Lagdera Constituency
- In office 2022–present

Personal details
- Born: 1971 (age 54–55) Mandera District, Kenya
- Party: Orange Democratic Movement (ODM) Formerly Safina Party
- Spouse: Married
- Children: 4
- Education: University of Nairobi (LLB) Harvard Law School (LLM)
- Occupation: Politician, Lawyer
- Committees: Chairman, Constitution Implementation Oversight Committee
- Awards: German Africa Prize (2011)

Abdikadir Hussein Mohamed (born 1971) is a Kenyan politician. As a member of Safina, Mohamed was elected to represent the Mandera Central Constituency in the National Assembly of Kenya in the 2007 Kenyan parliamentary election, defeating the incumbent Billow Kerrow.

== Early life and education ==
Abdiikadir was born in 1971 in Mandera District. He attended Alliance High School and the University of Nairobi.

He holds a master's degree in law from Harvard Law School and was the chairman of the parliamentary committee on constitutional affairs that saw the draft of the new Kenyan constitution.

== Political career ==
He was elected MP in Lagdera at the 2022 Kenyan general election from the ODM

He is the chairman of the Constitution Implementation Oversight Committee in parliament.

== Personal life ==
Abdikadir is a Muslim. He and his wife are the parents of four children.

Abdikadir was awarded the German Africa Prize in 2011. He is formerly Senior Advisor to the president of the republic of Kenya
