= Mazeras =

Coordinates: 3°57′45″S 39°33′04″E

Mazeras is a township in Kilifi County, formerly Coast Province, Kenya, approximately 15 kilometres (9.3 mi) north-west of Mombasa. Mazeras is located between Mariakani and Miritini along Nairobi Mombasa highway. The town serves as a local commercial and transport centre, with economic activities associated with trade, construction materials, manufacturing, transport services and rentals.

== Sandstone ==
Mazeras is well-known for its sandstone, part of the Duruma series — an extremity of the topology forming the Shimba Hills National Reserve. Known in Swahili as Maji-Ya Chumvi (literally "saltwater" due to the settlement's proximity to the Indian Ocean), the sandstone is from the Late Triassic period and its heat resisting properties make it suitable for a wide range of building purposes.

== Transport ==
Mazeras is on the Uganda Railway's main line between Mombasa and Nairobi. South of the settlement is the Mazeras Spiral, one of the original four railway spirals built on the railway to navigate steep inclines. The spiral is approximately 350 metres (1,150 ft) in diameter.

Preceding station	Uganda Railway	Following station
Miritini	Mazeras; Main line	Mariakani
