= Makutano, West Pokot, Kenya =

Makutano
- Location within Kenya
- Coordinates: 1.255286°N 35.091950°E
- Country: Kenya
- County: West Pokot County
- Time zone: UTC+3 (EAT)

Makutano is a settlement in Kenya's West Pokot County.

== Location ==
The settlement lies on the Kitale–Kapenguria–Lodwar Road (A-1), approximately 35 kilometres (22 mi) northeast of Kitale. It is about 420 kilometres (261 mi) by road northwest of Nairobi, Kenya's capital and largest city. The town's coordinates are 1°15'19.0"N, 35°05'31.0"E (Latitude:1.255286; Longitude:35.091950).

== Overview ==
Makutano lies adjacent to Kapenguria, the county headquarters, and is part of the greater Kapenguria Metropolitan Area. Makutano is also home to the Makutano Stadium of West Pokot County.
