= Banissa =

- Location within Kenya
- Coordinates: 3.9°N 40.33°E
- Country: Kenya
- County: Mandera County
- Time zone: UTC+3 (EAT)

Banissa (also spelled 'Banisa') is a town in Kenya's Mandera County. The headquarters of Banissa sub-county are located in the town.
