= Masalani =

- Location within Kenya
- Coordinates: 1.698°S 40.122°E
- Country: Kenya
- County: Garissa County

Population (2019)
  - Urban: 43,642
- Time zone: UTC+3 (EAT)

Masali may also refer to Masalani, Makueni District (another settlement in Kenya)

Masalani is a town in Garissa County, Kenya. It was the headquarters of the former Ijara District. It is located on the eastern shores of Tana River, 30 kilometres south of Hola and 60 kilometres north of Garsen The urban population was 43,642 in the 2019 census.

Administratively, it is one of four locations in the Masalani division. Masalani is also a ward in Ijara Constituency and Ijara County Council.

It is dominated by the Somali pastoralists of the Darod Samawadal clan. The two main sub-clans of Samawadal are Re-Mohamed and Abdalla.
