= Habaswein =

Habaswein Habaas weyn
- Location within Kenya
- Coordinates: 1.01°N 39.49°E
- Country: Kenya
- County: Wajir County

Population (2019)
  - Total: 174,134
  - Density: 10,912.5/km^{2} (28,263/sq mi)
- Time zone: UTC+3 (EAT)

Habaswein (Somali: Habaasweyne) is a town in Kenya's Wajir County, which is inhabited by Somalis. The much loved town is often referred to, colloquially, as "The Land Of Milk and Honey"

According to the 2019 census, the town was the second most populous in the county of Wajir with a population of 174,134. The unturmarked A13 highway from Isiolo to Mandera passes through Habaswein; it is located on the stretch from Modogashe to Wajir.
