= El Wak, Kenya =

Border town in Kenya

- Location in Kenya
- Coordinates: 02°48′10″N 40°55′39″E
- Country: Kenya
- County: Mandera County

Population (2019)
  - Total: 60,732

El Wak, also Elwak, is a town in Kenya, on the international border with Somalia. The name El Wak translates into "the well of God". There are about 50 wells spread across the town, each approximately 60 feet deep with interconnected underground passages.

== Location ==
The town is located in Mandera County, in extreme north eastern Kenya, approximately 177 kilometres (110 mi) northeast of Wajir, the nearest large town. El Wak, Kenya is approximately 169 kilometres (105 mi), southwest of the town of Mandera, where the county headquarters are located. The coordinates of the town are: 2°48'10.0"N, 40°55'39.0"E (Latitude:2.802771; Longitude:40.927510).

== Overview ==
The town, which lies approximately halfway between Wajir and Mandera, is the southern end of the proposed Elwak–Mandera Road. Directly across the border from El Wak is the neighbourhood in Somalia called Bur Ache, in the greater El Wak, Somalia area. The town has a new airstrip Elwak Airport, opened in February 2016.

== See also ==
- List of roads in Kenya
