= Rhamu =

Rhamu Raamo Raaxa
- Town
- Nickname: Town of the sweet water
- Location in Kenya
- Coordinates: 03°56′15″N 41°13′13″E
- Country: Kenya
- County: Mandera County

Population (2019 census Estimate)
  - Total: 143,850

Rhamu (Somali: Raamo), known to the locals as "shantooley", is a town in the Mandera County of Kenya situated in the northeastern part of Kenya, along the River Dawa. The town lies within a semi-arid region characterized by dry and hot conditions, with limited rainfall and sparse vegetation. It is largely populated by the Gurreh or Garre and Degodia tribes, which forms majority of the Mandera north constituency settling in the wards of Ashabito, Rhamu, shantoley deg murule as well as a substantial settlement of somalis. The town was previously built by the british colonial administration.

Rhamu is located at the international border between Kenya and Ethiopia. Due to its proximity to Ethiopia, Rhamu has historically been a center for cross-border trade. Local traders engage in the exchange of goods, including livestock, agricultural products, and other commodities with their Ethiopian counterparts.

The town serves as the Headquarters of the vast Mandera north constituency.

== Location ==
Rhamu is located in extreme northeastern Kenya, at the border with Ethiopia, approximately 76 kilometres (47 mi), by road, west of Mandera, where the headquarters of the county are located. This lies approximately 940 kilometres (584 mi), by road, northeast of Nairobi, the capital and largest city in the country. The coordinates of the town are:3°56'15.0"N, 41°13'13.0"E (Latitude:3.937499; Longitude:41.220277).

== Overview ==
In 1977, the town was the location of what became known as the Rhamu Incident. More recently, in 2014, ethnic conflict erupted between the Degodia and Garre, with some of the combatants coming from neighbouring Ethiopia, across the Dawa River. At least twenty people died in that conflict, with an estimated 13,000 internally displaced from their homes.

The Elwak–Mandera Road passes through the middle of town. Rhamu is serviced by Rhamu Airport.

== Population ==
In September 2014, the Kenya Red Cross estimated the population of the Rhamu at about 40,000. Rhamu serves as a significant trading center for the surrounding rural communities. The population of the town consists primarily of ethnic Somali residents, with a mix of other ethnic groups present as well.

== Economy ==
The economy of Rhamu is predominantly driven by trade and agriculture. The town serves as a hub for local farmers, livestock herders, and traders who bring their products to the local markets. Livestock, such as camels, goats, and sheep, play a crucial role in the livelihoods of the residents.

== See also ==
- List of roads in Kenya
