= Wajir =

Wajir Wajeer
- Town
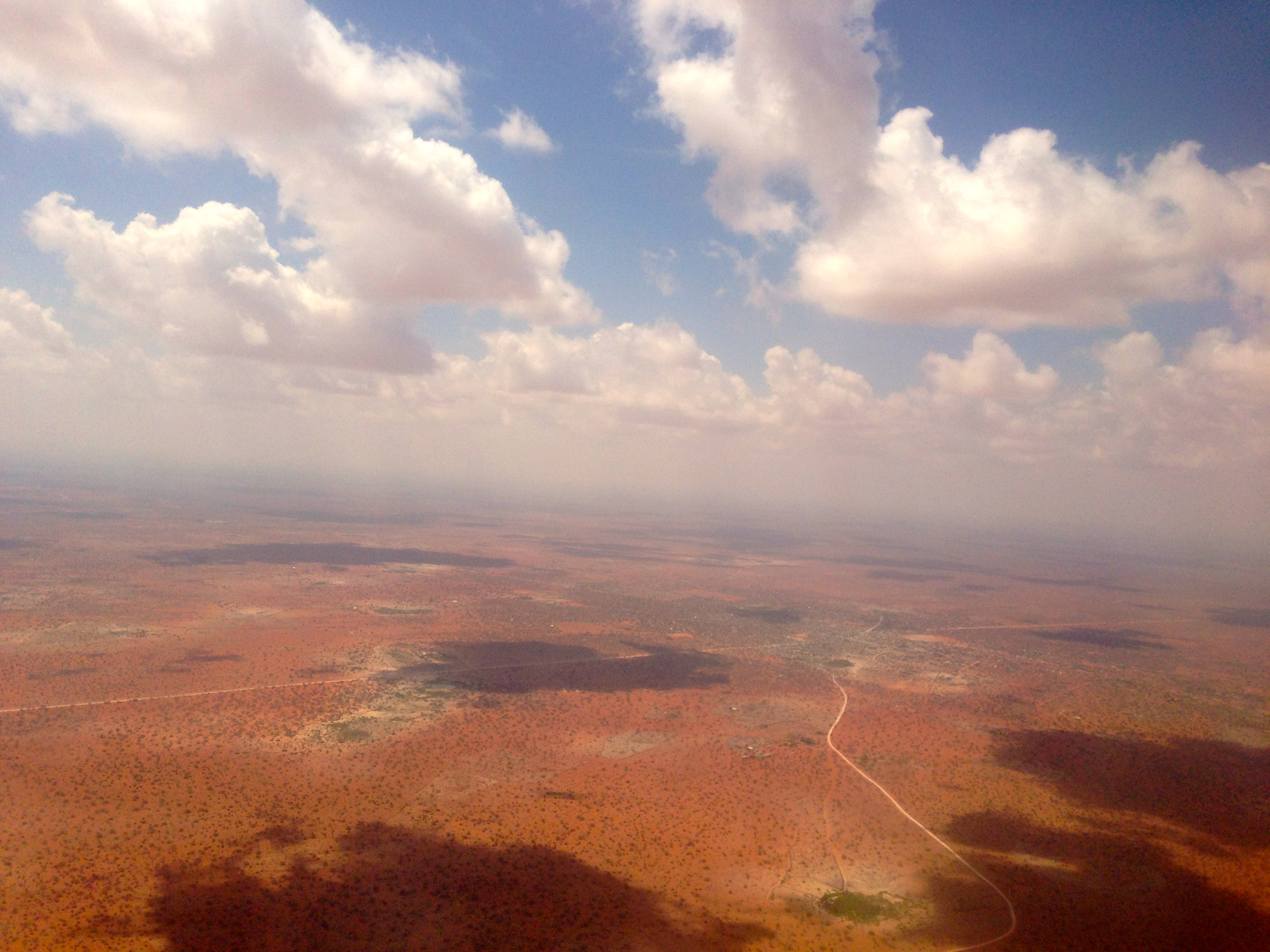

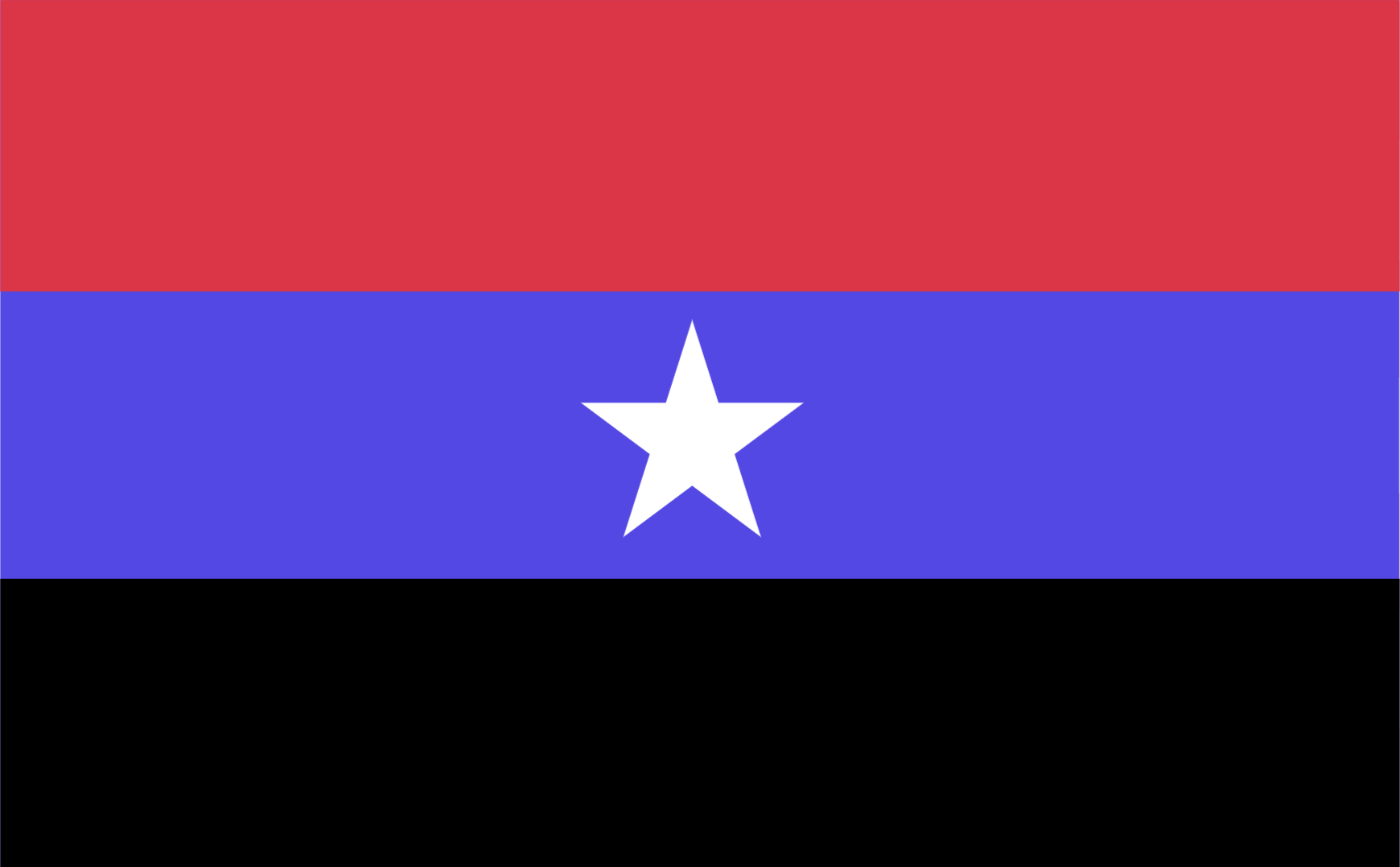
- Seal

- Location within Kenya Location within the Horn of Africa Location within Africa
- Coordinates: 01°45′00″N 40°03′00″E
- Country: Kenya
- County: Wajir County
- Elevation: 258 m (846 ft)

Population (2019)
  - Total: 130,116
- Postal code: 70200
- Area code: 46
- Climate: BWh

Wajir (Somali: Wajeer) is the capital of Wajir County Kenya. Situated in the former North Eastern Province.

== History ==
A cluster of cairns near Wajir are generally ascribed by the local inhabitants to the Maadiinle, a semi-legendary people of high stature, who are associated with the Somali. A. T. Curle (1933) reported the excavation of two of these large tumuli, finding traces of skeletal remains which crumbled at his touch, as well as earthenware shards and a copper ring.

Wajir was attacked by Italian forces in World War II.

Wajir was the site of the Wagalla massacre in 1984. The Kenyan army rounded up as many as 5,000 Somali men of the Degodia clan from their homes on the morning of 10 February. Although the ostensible purpose was to defuse clan fighting, the army held the Degodia captives at an airstrip for five days without water and food, before executing them.

== Overview ==
Wajir is located in an arid area prone to drought. It sits at a latitude and longitude of 01°45′00″N 40°03′00″E. (Latitude:1.75000; Longitude:40.05000). The town is served by Wajir Airport, with flights to Nairobi, Galkacyo and Mogadishu.

== Demographics ==
Wajir is mainly inhabited by Somalis, The 2019 census reported a total population of 150,116 inhabitants.

== Climate ==
Wajir has a hot arid climate (Köppen BWh).

Climate data for Wajir, elevation 258 m (846 ft), (1980–2016 normals)
Month	Jan	Feb	Mar	Apr	May	Jun	Jul	Aug	Sep	Oct	Nov	Dec	Year
Mean daily maximum °C (°F)	36.3 (97.3)	37.1 (98.8)	36.6 (97.9)	34.6 (94.3)	33.5 (92.3)	32.9 (91.2)	32.1 (89.8)	32.5 (90.5)	33.7 (92.7)	34.2 (93.6)	33.2 (91.8)	34.4 (93.9)	34.3 (93.7)
Mean daily minimum °C (°F)	22.7 (72.9)	23.4 (74.1)	24.3 (75.7)	24.5 (76.1)	23.6 (74.5)	22.5 (72.5)	22.0 (71.6)	21.9 (71.4)	22.3 (72.1)	23.3 (73.9)	23.3 (73.9)	22.9 (73.2)	23.1 (73.5)
Average precipitation mm (inches)	12.2 (0.48)	8.4 (0.33)	27.1 (1.07)	51.8 (2.04)	18.6 (0.73)	2.7 (0.11)	2.0 (0.08)	1.7 (0.07)	3.0 (0.12)	55.0 (2.17)	52.8 (2.08)	26.8 (1.06)	262.1 (10.34)
Source: World Meteorological Organization (precipitation 1988–2018)

== Sports ==
=== Stadium ===
Following a 3 February 2026 meeting between Wajir County Governor Ahmed Abdullahi and officials from the Ministry of Defence, Defence Principal Secretary Patrick Mariru announced that the Kenya Defense Forces would construct a 10,000 seater stadium in Wajir. Ahmed Abdullahi said that construction would begin immediately and would be complete by the 63rd Madaraka Day, where the event would be hosted. Construction officially begun in late February. Project engineer Dennis Oloo said there would be a 24/7 hour construction work and that workers would do so in three shifts. The national government handed it over to the County Government of Wajir on 29 March. According to President William Ruto, it would cost Ksh. 900 million. The 63rd Madaraka Day national celebrations were held at Wajir Stadium. During his speech, Ahmed Abdullahi asked for the stadium to be renamed in honour of Ahmed Mohamed Khalif, the first Cabinet minister from Wajir, the president agreed to do so. Ahmed was appointed by President Mwai Kibaki as the Minister for Labour in 2003, less than a month before he died in a plane crash accident. Wajir stadium will be the first in the north-eastern region to be built to international standards, it has a seating capacity of 10,000, a standard football pitch, an eight-lane athletics track, modern changing rooms, VIP lounges, terraces with seating, a borehole for its water supply and abundant parking space.

== Administrative divisions ==
Wajir is the capital of the Wajir County. The county is subdivided into 6 Constituencies (Wajir South Constituency, Wajir East Constituency, Wajir West Constituency, Wajir North Constituency, Tarbaj Constituency and Eldas Constituency. These constituencies are represented by Members of Parliament in the National Assembly. The county has a total of 30 wards. Each ward elects a member to the Wajir County Assembly.

== Etymology ==
Wajir’s name comes from Somali and means “valley” or “low-lying area.” The name is derived from the Somali word Waji which refers to “a depression in the land.”

== See also ==
- Wajir Airport
- Wajir County
- List of airports in Kenya
