= Mandera =

Mandera Mandheer
- Town
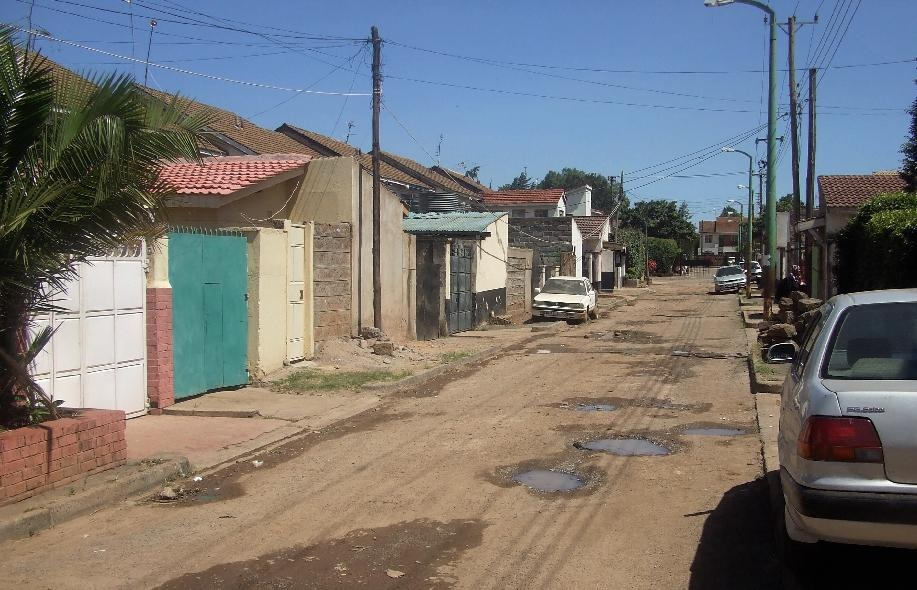

- Location within Kenya Location within the Horn of Africa Location within Africa
- Coordinates: 03°55′N 41°50′E
- Country: Kenya
- County: Mandera

Population (2019)
  - Total: 114,718
- Time zone: UTC+3 (EAT)

Mandera (Somali: Mandheera) is the capital of Mandera County in the former North Eastern Province of Kenya. It is situated at around 3°55′N 41°50′E, near the borders with Somalia and Ethiopia.

== Districts ==
Mandera was the capital of the former Mandera District.

As a whole, it used to constitute one district in previous administrations, which is now divided into six sub-counties and Constituencies; namely,

1. Mandera East
2. Mandera Central
3. Mandera West
4. Mandera North
5. Banissa
6. Elwak
7. Lafey

The county occupies an area of 26,744 km^{2}.

Among the notable incidents of Mandera history was the Rhamu Incident of the 1977 in which Somali military invaded Ethiopian defences from the Kenyan side. A force of 1500 Somali soldiers attacked a border post, and killed 30 Kenyan police officers and soldiers. The Somali army successfully crossed into the Sidamo Region of Ethiopia in the so called Ogaden War.

== Demographics ==
Most of Mandera's inhabitants are ethnic Somali. Economic mainstay largely remains livestock trade.

== Climate ==
Mandera

Climate chart (precipitation, max. and min. temperature)
J	F	M	A	M	J	J	A	S	O	N	D
1 35 23	4 36 25	24 36 26	83 35 26	24 33 25	0 32 24	0 32 23	1 33 23	2 34 24	43 34 24	36 34 24	9 35 23
- █ Average max. and min. temperatures in °C
- █ Precipitation totals in mm
Imperial conversion
J	F	M	A	M	J	J	A	S	O	N	D
0 95 73	0.2 97 77	0.9 97 79	3.3 95 79	0.9 91 77	0 90 75	0 90 73	0 91 73	0.1 93 75	1.7 93 75	1.4 93 75	0.4 95 73
- █ Average max. and min. temperatures in °F
- █ Precipitation totals in inches

Mandera's climate is categorized as arid under the Köppen climate classification. Temperatures tend to be hot throughout the year. Daily temperatures are typically above 30 °C (86 °F), while at night, they can fall to 20 °C (68 °F). Precipitation is extremely low, with the area receiving a minimal amount of rain. Droughts are not unusual, often resulting in significant loss of livestock in rural areas where pastoralism is common.

== Notable people ==
- Rahma Guliye, politician

== See also ==
- Mandera triangle for the border region disputed between Kenya, Somalia and Ethiopia, centered on the city of Mandera
