= Mandera County =

- County
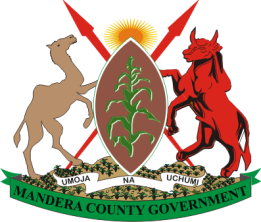
- Flag Coat of arms

- Location of Mandera County in Kenya
- Coordinates: 3.41667°N 40.6667°E
- Country: Kenya
- Formed: 4 March 2013
- Capital and largest town: Mandera
- Other towns: El Wak

Government
  - Governor: Mohamed Adan Khalif
  - Senator: Ali Roba
  - Women Rep: Ummulkheir Kassim

Area
  - Total: 25,797.7 km^{2} (9,960.5 sq mi)
  - Land: 25,797.7 km^{2} (9,960.5 sq mi)
  - Water: 0 km^{2} (0 sq mi)
- Elevation: 1,200 m (3,900 ft)

Population (2019)
  - Total: 867,457
  - Density: 33.6254/km^{2} (87.0893/sq mi)

GDP (PPP)
  - Total: ▲$1.612 billion (42nd)(2024)
  - Per Capita: ▲$1,724 (2024) (47th)

GDP (NOMINAL)
  - Total: ▲$541 Million (2024) (42nd)
  - Per Capita: ▲$579 (2024) (47th)
- Time zone: UTC+3 (EAT)
- HDI (2024): ▲0.484 (47th): low
- Website: www.mandera.go.ke

Mandera County is a county in northeastern Kenya, bordering Ethiopia to the north, Somalia to the east, and Wajir County to the south. It is predominantly home to the Somali community, with a population of about 983,000 (2024)-(nullified), making it the 28th largest county in Kenya by population. Covering an area of approximately 25,797 square kilometers, Mandera County features natural landscapes, including the Dawa River and vast deserts.

The primary economic activities include pastoralism and agriculture, with a focus on livestock. The capital and largest town is Mandera.

== Economy ==
Mandera County, while facing persistent developmental and insecurity challenges, has shown signs of economic progress in recent years. In 2024, the county's economy grew by 3.5%, reflecting gradual recovery in key sectors such as livestock and informal trade. Despite this growth, Mandera remains the poorest county in Kenya by GDP per capita, estimated at US$500 as of 2024, according to the Kenya National Bureau of Statistics (KNBS).

With a population of approximately 936,000, Mandera ranked 42nd out of 47 counties in total economic output, recording a GDP of US$140 million in 2022. The county's economy is primarily pastoralist, heavily dependent on livestock production and trade. Recurrent insecurity, especially along its borders with Somalia and Ethiopia, continues to undermine private investment, public service delivery, and broader economic diversification.

== Climate ==
The county has a temperature range between 24C – 42C. Rainfall is very low and unreliable with annual average of 91.7mm annually. Long rains normally occur in April and May averaging 69.1mm while short rains in October and November averaging 122mm.

== Demographics ==
Religion in Mandera County (2019)
1. Islam (99.3%)
2. Others (0.70%)

The Kenya Population and Housing Survey report (KPHC) 2009 showed that Mandera County had a population of 1,025,756 persons. This comprised 559,943 males (54.6%) and 465,813 females (45.4%). The county's population was projected to be 1,399,503 persons, comprising 763,966 males and 635,537 females in 2017.

The county has a total population of 867,457 of which 434,976 are males, 432,444 females and 37 intersex persons. There are 125,763 household with an average household size of 6.9 persons per household and a population density 33 people per square kilometre 2020.

It was also projected that the population would be 1,699,437 persons comprising 927,695 males and 771,742 females in the year 2022.

Like in other areas of North Eastern counties, Mandera is predominantly inhabited by ethnic Somalis.

== Population ==
Historical population
Year	Pop.	±%
1979	105,601	—
1989	123,787	+17.2%
1999	250,372	+102.3%
2009	1,025,756	+309.7%
2019	867,457	−15.4%

== Administrative and political units ==
=== Administrative units ===
There are 7 sub counties, 22 divisions, 97 locations and 141 sub-locations.

==== Sub-counties ====
- Mandera East
- Mandera West
- Banisa
- Mandera North
- Lafey
- Mandera South
- Kutullo
- Arabia
- Kiliwehiri
- [Ashabito-Mandera] Newly established Sub-county
- [Dandu-Mandera] Newly established Sub-county

=== Electoral constituencies ===
It has 6 constituencies and 30 county assembly wards.

- Mandera West Constituency
- Banissa Constituency
- Mandera East Constituency
- Lafey Constituency
- Mandera South Constituency
- Mandera North Constituency

=== Political leadership ===
Mohamed Adan Khalif is the governor in office after being elected and his deputy is DR Ali Moalim Mohamud. Ali Ibrahim Roba is the Senator who replaced Billow Kerow who was the first elected senator. Amina Gedow is the second elected women representative who won against Fathia Mahbuub, the first women representative for the county.

For Mandera County, the County Executive Committee comprises:-

County Executive Committee
	Number
The Governor	1
The Deputy Governor	1
The County Secretary	1
The Members of County Assembly	48
Members of the CEC	10

==== Members of Parliament 2017-2022 (Mandera County) ====
1. Hon Omar Mohamed – omar salla of EFP Party Member o.f Parliament Mandera Constituency.
2. Hon. Hassan, Kulow Maalim of EFP party Member of Parliament West Banisa Constituency.
3. Hon. Hassan, Omar Mohamed Maalim of EFP Party Member of Parliament Mandera East Constituency.
4. Hon. Ibrahim, Abdi Mude of EFP Party Member of Parliament Lafey Constituency.
5. Hon. Ali, Adan Haji of Jubilee Party Member of Parliament Mandera South Constituency.
6. Hon. Abdullah, Bashir Sheikh of Jubilee Party Member of Parliament Mandera North Constituency.

==== Members of the County Assembly ====
1. Saad Sheikh Ahmed (Abajano), EFP Party
2. Hussein Adan Haji (HajiHuska), EFP Party

== Health ==
There is a total of 116 health facilities in the county and 1520 health personnel of different cadre.

HIV prevalence is at 1.8%, below the national average of 5.3%.

== Transport and communication ==
The county is covered by 1,884.5 km of road network. Of this 1,390 km is covered by earth surface, 494.5 km is murram surface.

There are 13 cyber cafes, 5 post offices installed letter boxes, 1150 rented letter boxes and 1100 rented letter boxes, and 50 vacant letter boxes.

== Trade and commerce ==
There are 32 trading centers, 127 licensed retail traders, 212 licensed hawkers and 10 petrol stations.

Urban Centre	2022Population
Mandera	141,116
El Wak	59,000
Rhamu	56,185
Takaba	51,546

Mandera Town is the most densely populated urban area of the county, while Takaba is the least populated.

The town is the oldest and main urban section of the county and its high population is attributed to the residents' diverse economic activities. The town has small-scale traders; retailers, artisans, hoteliers, grocers and even cross-border traders.

== County subdivisions ==
As of 2022, Mandera County is divided into 6 sub-counties:

Sub-county	Population	Pop. density	Headquarters
Mandera South	410,247	66	El Wak
Mandera East	296,281	106	Mandera
Mandera North	281,111	51	Rhamu
Mandera West	267,901	56	Takaba
Bannisa	261,891	78	Bannisa
Lafey	182,006	54	Lafey

Mandera East that hosts the county headquarters in Mandera Town is the most densely populated constituency with 106 persons per square kilometre. Mandera North is the least densely populated constituency with 42 persons per square kilometre, but which is projected to be 47 and 51 persons per square kilometres 2020 and 2022 respectively.

== Electoral constituencies ==
Constituencies of Mandera County
Map	Constituency Names	Constituency No.	Approximate Population (2022)
	Mandera West	39	267,901
	Banissa	40	261,891
	Mandera North	41	231,498
	Mandera South	42	410,247
	Mandera East	43	296,281
	Lafey	44	182,006
