= Wajir County =

- County
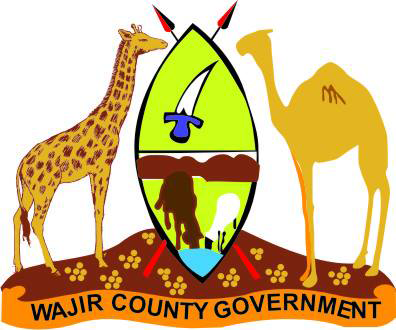
- Flag Coat of arms

- Location of Wajir County in Kenya
- Coordinates: 1.74722°N 40.0689°E
- Country: Kenya
- Formed: 4 March 2013
- Capital: Wajir

Government
  - Governor: Ahmed Jiir

Area
  - Total: 55,840.6 km^{2} (21,560.2 sq mi)

Population (2019)
  - Total: 781,263
  - Density: 13.9909/km^{2} (36.2364/sq mi)
- Time zone: UTC+3 (EAT)
- GDP (PPP): $1.442B (30th)
- Per Capita (PPP): $1,701 (46th)
- GDP (nominal): $529 Million USD(30th)
- Per Capita (nominal): $624(46th)
- Website: www.wajir.go.ke

Wajir County is a county in the former North Eastern Province of Kenya. Its capital and largest town is Wajir. The county had a population of 781,263 during the 2019 Census. It has an area of 55,840.6 km^{2} (21,560.2 sq mi). The county is bordered to the north by Ethiopia, to the northeast by Mandera County, to the east by Somalia, to the south by Garissa County, to the west by Isiolo County and to the northwest by Marsabit County.

== Geography and climate ==
The county consists of a featureless plain that rises from around 150 metres (492 ft) above sea level in the south and east to 400 metres (1312 ft) in the north. The area is prone to seasonal flooding as well as seasonal swamps. Wajir county has a semi-arid climate with annual rainfall of around 240 mm (9.44 in).

== Population ==
Historical population
Year	Pop.	±%
1979	139,319	—
1989	122,769	−11.9%
1999	319,261	+160.1%
2009	661,941	+107.3%
2019	781,263	+18.0%

Urban Centre	2019 Population
Wajir South	216,814
Habaswein	198,814
Buna	49,886
Tarbaj	56,232
Eldas	38,509
Kutulo	54,218
Wajir East	119,654
Wajir North	62,206
Wajir West	135,828

Religion in Wajir County

Religion (2019 Census)	Number	Percentage
Islam	767,312	98.97%
Catholicism	3,060	0.39%
Protestant	1,298	0.17%
African Instituted Churches	263	0.03%
Evangelical Churches	247	0.03%
Orthodox	20	0.00%
Other Christian	2,280	0.29%
Hindu	609	0.08%
Traditionalists	3	0.00%
Other	86	0.01%
Atheists	39	0.00%
Unknown	50	0.01%
Not Stated	35	0.00%

== County subdivisions ==
=== Sub-counties ===
As of 2019, Wajir County is divided into 7 sub-counties:

Sub-county	Population	Land area (Sq. km)	Pop. density
Eldas	98,509	4,444.0	12
Habaswein	98,814	6,912.5	17
Tarbaj	156,232	9,650.9	9
Wajir East	119,654	4,055.1	27
Wajir North	112,206	8,042.9	15
Wajir South	116,814	7,732.6	18
Wajir West	135,828	9,042.3	13

=== Divisions ===
Wajir County was divided into fourteen administrative divisions:

Administrative divisions
Division	Population*	Pop. density*	Area (km^{2})	Headquarters
Buna	29,160	5	x	Buna
Bute	14,684	20	x	Bute
Central	51,006	22	x	Wajir
Diff	109,052	3	x	
Eldas	9,166	4	x	Eldas
Sarman	29,166	4	x	Sarman
Griftu	42,333	6	x	Griftu
Gurar	18,087	7	x	Gurar
Habaswein	207,467	6	x	Habaswein
Hadado	19,787	5	x	Hadado
Kotulo	44,218	8	x	Kotulo
Lafaley	5,883	12	x	
Lagboqol	15,699	3	x	Lagboqol
Tarbaj	82,758	4	x	Tarbaj
Wajir-Bor	17,046	4	x	
Total	366,847	4	x	
* 1999 census
