= Charles Ong'ondo Were =

Kenyan politician (1973/1974–2025)

Honourable Charles Ong'ondo Were

Member of Parliament
- In office 31 August 2017 – 30 April 2025
- Preceded by: Joseph Oyugi Magwanga
- Succeeded by: Boyd Were
- Constituency: Kasipul Constituency

Personal details
- Born: 1973 or 1974 South Nyanza District, Kenya
- Died: 30 April 2025 (aged 51) Nairobi, Kenya
- Party: Orange Democratic Movement
- Other political affiliations: Azimio la Umoja
- Children: 6 including Boyd Were Ongondo
- Education: Meru University; Mount Kenya University

Charles Ong'ondo Were (1973 or 1974 – 30 April 2025) was a Kenyan politician who was a Member of Parliament. He was the Member of Parliament for Kasipul Constituency in Homa Bay County. He became the second Member of parliament for Kasipul to die while in office after Peter Owidi, who died in the evening of 23 November 2005.

== Early life and education ==
Were hailed from the Karabok area in Homa Bay County.

Were held a Bachelor of Business Management and a Diploma in Business Management from Mount Kenya University, along with a Certificate in Computerised Accounting from Meru University.

== Personal life ==
Were was married to three wives, one of whom died, and had six children; Boyd Were, Procta Ojaa, Gynsen, Immaculate Were, Paval and Ryan. His son, Boyd Were Ong'ondo succeeded him as MP.

== Political career ==
Were began his political career in 2017, when he was elected as the Member of Parliament for Kasipul Constituency in Homa Bay County. He won the seat on an ODM ticket and was re-elected in 2022.

During his tenure, he served on the Departmental Committee on Blue Economy and Irrigation, focusing on policies related to water resources and agricultural sustainability. Before entering politics, he held executive roles in multiple companies, including Victoria Cleaning Services Ltd, Metrookam Properties Ltd, and Benga Group Holding Ltd.

== Murder ==
On the evening of 30 April 2025, Were was shot dead inside his car by motorcycling gunmen at a traffic stop along Ngong Road in Nairobi. He was 51. Were had previously stated that his life was in danger, and police said the shooting appeared to be premeditated. One of the gunmen had been captured and taken into custody by the police while the others escaped to avoid apprehension for Were's assassination.

== See also ==
- 12th Parliament of Kenya
- 13th Parliament of Kenya
