= Oyugis =

Coordinates: 0°30′S 34°43′E

Oyugis is the second-largest town (after Homa Bay town) in Homa Bay County in Nyanza Kenya. The town lies along the Kisumu-Kisii highway. It is the commercial and financial centre of Rachuonyo Sub-County in Homa Bay County of the former Nyanza Province.

Though small in comparison to neighbouring Kisii, Oyugis has recently registered fast growth especially since the creation of the district and increased use of the town by NGOs operating in the area and the Sondu Miriu hydroelectric power station.

== Location ==
Oyugis is located 20 kilometres north of Kisii town along the major A1 Highway. There is also an inter-county road (C26) connecting Oyugis to Kendu Bay while C18 road links Oyugis with Homa Bay Town via Rangwe. There are also other link roads like Oyugis-Gamba which heads to Nyamira and Kisii counties.

== Population ==
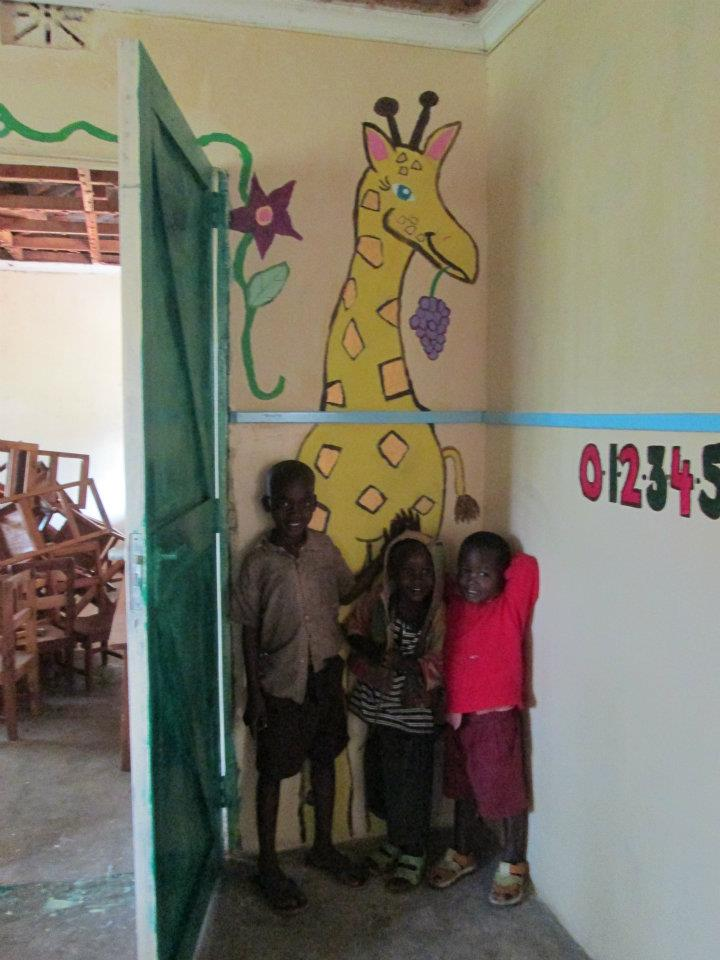
Preschoolers at the Amani Daycare Center pose for a photo in Oyugis.

At the last census taken, Oyugis had a town council with a population of 52'433, of whom 9'084 are classified urban (1999 census). Much of the adult population has taken to the Agrarian lifestyle.

== Electoral constituency ==
Oyugis area forms Kasipul Constituency. It has five County Assembly wards: West Kamagak Ward, East Kamagak Ward, West Kasipul Ward, Central Kasipul Ward and South Kasipul Ward. Administratively, Oyugis is in Kasipul division which is one of the 19 divisions in Homabay county. The Kasipul Constituency is partitioned from the Kasipul Kabondo Constituency.

== Education ==
The town hosts several important academic institutions like the Agoro Sare High School and Oyugis Craft Training Center. Other notable institutions include Wire Secondary School, Nyabola Girls school, Buoye Secondary School Mititi mixed secondary school, Nyagiela secondary, DOL-Kodera mixed secondary, Nyagowa secondary school, Kwoyo-kotieno secondary school among others. It is also the home to one of the oldest primary schools in Kenya, Wire Primary School, DOL-kodera Primary established in 1912, 1927 respectively.

== Hearts For Kenya ==
Hearts for Kenya, based in Louisville, Kentucky, exists for the purpose of combating poverty, hunger and disease in small, agrarian communities within the Nyanza province of Kenya. Its headquarters, the "Amani Daycare Center and Agrarian Institute" are located in the town of Oyugis. Ancillary projects, which are vital to the success of the agricultural project, are centered around building, nutrition, education, assistance to orphans and widows, health services, and a tree nursery. The intent of Hearts for Kenya is to enable the local citizens to carry on the projects autonomously.

The core of the venture spearheaded by Hearts for Kenya, now in its eleventh year, is a project aimed primarily at increasing agricultural productivity and establishing a niche crop. By 2017, they hope to have a medical clinic built, established and operating.
