= Amos Kipngeno Misik =

- Born: Amos Kipngeno Misik; 1 May 1958 (age 68); Kibugat, Tabaita, Kericho County
- Education: Agoro Sare High School, Kabianga High School, Technical University of Kenya, Chartered Institute of Marketing
- Occupation: Prisons Officer
- Honours: Order of the Grand Warrior, OGW

Amos Kipng'eno Misik (born 1 May 1958) is a retired Kenya Prisons Commander.

== Early life ==
Amos Kipng’eno Misik was born on (Thursday) 1 May 1958 at Kibugat Village in the present Sigowet Division, Kericho County. He attended Cherwa Primary School in Kisumu County (1967–1973), Agoro Sare High School in Homa Bay County (1974–1977) and Kabianga High School in Kericho (1978–1979).

== Education ==
Mr Misik obtained a Diploma in Marketing from the Kenya Polytechnic (1991–1992) and Diploma in Public Relations Management from the Kenya Institute of Management (2005). He is a finalist of the Chartered Institute of Marketing (UK) and was elected a member of the Institute in 1994. He has also attended leadership and administration training at the Kenya School of Government (formerly Kenya Institute of Administration).

== Public service ==
He joined Kenya Prisons Service as a Cadet Officer in 1980 and rose through the ranks to the rank of Deputy Commissioner of Prisons. He has served in the Prisons Department in different positions, including that of Deputy Officer in Charge and Officer in Charge of several prisons (1986–1990 and 1994–1996), Head of Marketing (2002–2006), and Head of Reforms, Training and Public Relations at the Prisons Headquarters (2011–2012). Misik is the immediate former Regional Prisons Commander, Nyanza Region, a position he held since 2012 until his retirement in 2018. Mr Dixon Mwakazi took over as the Regional Prisons Commander.He received the Presidential award of the Order of the Grand Warrior of Kenya (OGW) in 2010 as an honor for the outstanding service to the nation.

== Publication ==
Mr. Misik has authored a book, A History of the Kipkendek Clan (Kapchepitoch Family), that was officially launched in December 2018 at Kericho Tea Boys School. The event was attended by Prof. Davy Kiprotich Koech, Prof. Moses Rugut, Michael Misik, Moses Misik among other guests. The book describes the roles and underscores the importance attached to the clan system among the larger Kalenjin community and the Kipsigis people in particular. The author of this book attempts to trace and explain the origin of Kipkendek clan which he belongs and its place within the larger Kalenjin and Kipsigis communities.
