= Rachuonyo District =

Former administrative district of Kenya

Coordinates: 0°30′S 34°43′E

Rachuonyo District was an administrative district in the Nyanza Province of Kenya. Its capital town was Kosele, and previously, Oyugis. The district had a population of 307,126 (1999 census) and an area of 945 km². The district had two constituencies, Kasipul Kabondo and Karachuonyo, which have been part of Homa Bay County since 2010.

Barack Obama Sr., the father of Barack Obama, the 44th President of the United States, was born in Rachuonyo District.

Local authorities (councils)
Authority	Type	Population*	Urban pop.*
Oyugis	Town	52,433	9,084
Kendu Bay	Town	29,638	390
Rachuonyo	County	225,055	0
Total	-	307,126	9,474
* 1999 census. Source:

Administrative divisions
Division	Population*	Urban pop.*	Headquarters
East Karachuonyo	74,584	381	Kendu Bay
Kabondo	49,934	0	Kabondo
Kasipul	129,854	8,110	Oyugis
Rachuonyo	52,754	0	
Total	307,126	8,491	-
* 1999 census. Sources: , ,
