= Florence Mutua =

Kenyan politician

Florence Mutua (born 1968) is the former Woman Member of National Assembly for Busia County.

== Background ==
Mutua is the firstborn of the family's four children. She was born to a Luhya father and a Kamba mother.

Her father died when she was 3 years old. She was taken to her maternal home in Ukambani, where she grew up under the care of her grandparents.

== Education ==
Mutua attended Arya Primary School in Nairobi, Kenya. She holds a diploma in public relations from Wote College, a diploma in medical secretarial from Kenya Polytechnic (now Technical University of Kenya), a diploma in business and office management from Kenya School of Business Studies, a bachelor's degree in business administration from Methodist University, and a master's degree in project planning from the University of Nairobi.

== Service history ==
Mutua began her career in 1993, when she worked as a medical secretary at the Aga Khan Hospital.

From 2000–2012, she worked at UNICEF in various capacities, including as a program assistant, a human resources assistant, and in operations.

With the promulgation of the new constitution in Kenya in 2010, Florence joined politics and vied for the position of woman member of the National Assembly in Busia County.
