= Kasipul Kabondo Constituency =

Kenyan electoral constituency

Kasipul Kabondo
- Former constituency for the Parliament of Kenya
- District: South Nyanza

Former constituency
- Created: 1963
- Abolished: 2013
- Number of members: One
- Replaced by: Kabondo Kasipul; Kasipul

Kasipul Kabondo Constituency was an electoral constituency in Kenya. It was one of two constituencies in Rachuonyo District. With the new constitution of 2010, the constituency was divided into Kasipul Constituency and Kabondo Kasipul, both in Homa Bay County.

== Members of Parliament ==
| Elections | MP | Party | Notes |
|---|---|---|---|
| 1963 | Samuel Onyango Ayodo | KANU | |
| 1969 | James Ezekiel Mbori | KANU | One-party system |
| 1974 | Samuel Onyango Ayodo | KANU | One-party system |
| 1979 | Samuel Onyango Ayodo | KANU | One-party system |
| 1983 | James Ezekiel Mbori | KANU | One-party system. |
| 1988 | James Ezekiel Mbori | KANU | One-party system. |
| 1992 | Otieno Kopiyo | Ford-Kenya | |
| 1997 | William Otula | NDP | |
| 2002 | Peter Owidi | NARC | Owidi died in 2005 |
| 2005 | Paddy Ahenda | LPK | By-elections |
| 2007 | Joseph Oyugi Magwanga | ODM | |

== Locations and wards ==
Locations
| Location | Population* |
| East Kamagak | 15,044 |
| Kakelo | 17,080 |
| Kachieng | 8,740 |
| Kasewe | 11,498 |
| Kodera | 14,767 |
| Kojwach | 18,893 |
| Kokech | 9,189 |
| Kokwanyo | 9,763 |
| Konuonga | 9,548 |
| Kowidi | 14,094 |
| Kowour | 14,280 |
| North Kamagak | 15,198 |
| Ramba | 9,647 |
| Ramula | 6,136 |
| Wang'chieng | 16,281 |
| West Kamagak | 18,103 |
| Total | x |
1999 census.

Wards
| Ward | Registered Voters | Local Authority | Councillor |
| Ayoro / Nyandong'e | 4,087 | Oyugis town | |
| Central Kasipul | 6,663 | Rachuonyo county | |
| Kabondo East | 8,827 | Rachuonyo county | |
| Kabondo West | 9,706 | Rachuonyo county | |
| Kakelo | 4,890 | Rachuonyo county | |
| Kojwach | 5,060 | Rachuonyo county | |
| Kokwanyo | 3,219 | Rachuonyo county | |
| Mawira / Rabuor | 3,270 | Oyugis town | |
| Obisa | 5,445 | Oyugis town | |
| Sikri | 3,332 | Oyugis town | Simon Otieno Nyabola(2006-2007) |
| West Kasipul | 7,399 | Rachuonyo county | |
| Wire Hill / Migwa | 2,539 | Oyugis town | |
| Total | 64,437 | | |
| *September 2005. | | | |
