= Lake Simbi National Sanctuary =

Lake in Kenya

Lake Simbi
- Location within Kenya Location within Africa
- Coordinates: 0°25′S 34°40′E
- Basin countries: Kenya
- Max. length: 0.7 km (0.43 mi)
- Max. width: 0.5 km (0.31 mi)
- Max. depth: 25 m (82 ft)

Lake Simbi is a small volcanic crater soda lake in Kenya. The lake is located outside Kendu Bay and close to the shore of Lake Victoria. The lake and the shore together form the Lake Simbi National Sanctuary which is run by the Kenya Wildlife Service. Flamingos and other birds are coming to the Lake Simbi National Sanctuary. The birds make the lake attractive for locals and tourists. The local name for lake Simbi is Simbi Nyaima.
