= Kenya Polytechnic Handball Club =

The Technical University of Kenya Handball Club was established in 2003 in Nairobi, Kenya. It has since gone on to establish itself as one of Kenya's most successful clubs.

== Men's team ==
The men's team won the university's league (KUSA Handball League) in 2008, 2009,2010 and 2011. They are one of the better teams in the country having finished third in the Kenya Handball Federation national league for three seasons in a row from 2008-2010.

(Kenya) Technical University Handball
- Full name: Technical University of Kenya Handball Club
- Nickname: Ingwe Handball
- Founded: 2003
- Location: Nairobi, Kenya
- Ground: University of Nairobi Grounds
- Coach: Henry Savulane
- Captain: Mike Indasi
- League: KHF League

== History ==
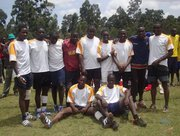
Kenya poly handball team.

In 2003, The Technical University of Kenya registered their men's team to compete in the Kenya Handball Federation League, with Duncan Ayiemba, the former Aga Khan High School, Nairobi skipper, as the captain of the team. The club went on to register mixed results in the league as well as in the prestigious Joe Muigwa Cup that season. The team was maintained for the next seasons until 2007 when Peter Mwathi, who was the National Women's team coach, took over. He kicked off his tenure by undertaking an aggressive recruitment drive with the aim of replacing the outgoing players with young, skilled and gifted players fresh from high school. This resulted in the signing of influential players such as Lewis Nyaga, Paul Mwangi and Adrian Emunye (Aga Khan High School, Nairobi), John Wekesa and Kevin Lukorito (Kimilili High School), Cyprian Maina (Mombasa Polytechnic), Mike Indasi, Clarence Oyule, Meshak Odero (Musingu High School, Francis Manuthu (Kiambu High School), Marin Ekode AND Eddie Kavai (Mukumu Boys High School), Alex Ndeto (Tala Boys High School) and Emmanuel Kidiga (Mangu High school). These were added to the bulk of experienced players present at the club such as Evans Juma and Duncan Ayiemba resulted in a winning machine that challenged for honors on all fronts and in the 2008-2009 season, the team finished in third position of the KHF National League and Joe Muigwa Cup behind Cereals handball and Ulinzi Handball clubs. The 2010-2011 season saw the arrival of Fibian Mathenge (Mangu High School) to a team that was about to witness the last term of Peter Mwathi as head coach, who has since gone on to take over at Strathmore University Handball. The team registered good results that season by winning the KUSA Handball league while finishing third in KHF National League and the Joe Muigwa Cup. Henry Savulane, a former Kenya International, has since taken over the reins at the club. Henry Savulane has made 2 more signings that includes Stephen Obanya and Kevin Kiarie to replace Victor Otwoma who went to Cereals handball club. The team average age is 24yrs

== Titles and seasons (men's team) ==
Season	KHF League	Joe Muigwa Cup	KUSA League	Strath open '	Moi Open'	Shujaa Open	KUSA TOURNEY
2003/2004	-	-	-				
2004/2005	-	-	-				
2005/2006	-	-	-				
2006/2007	-	-	-				
2007/2008	7th	-	-				
2008/2009	3rd	3rd	1st				
2009/2010	3rd	3rd	1st				
2010/2011	4th	3rd	2nd				
2011	-	-	-	1st			
2011	-	-	-	-	1st		
2011	-	-	-	-	-	1st	
2011	-	-	-	-	-	-	1ST

== Current squad ==
No.	Position	Name
1	GK	Martin Ekode
2	GK	Duncan Muriithi
3	Right Back	Lewis Nyaga
4	Center Back	Clarence Oyule
5	Left Back	Fibian Mathenge
6	Right Winger	Paul Mwangi
7	Pivot	Eddie Kavai
8	Center Back	Cyprian Maina
9	Left Back	Mike Indasi
10	Right Back	Alex Ndeto
11	Center Back	Emmanuel Kidiga
12	Right Winger	Vincent Odour
13	Right back	John Wekesa
14	Right winger	Kevini Lukoriti
15	GK	Steven Obanya
16	GK	John Kiarie
17	left winger	Derrick Kadenge
