= Jared Benson Kangwana =

Kenyan businessman (born 1949)

- Born: 6 January 1949 (age 77); Kisii, Kenya
- Citizenship: Kenya
- Education: University of Nairobi; Kenya School of Law; University of Edinburgh
- Occupations: Entrepreneur, businessman and lawyer
- Known for: Business, philanthropy
- Title: Chancellor; Technical University of Kenya
- Awards: Moran of the Burning Spear (MBS), Honorary Warden

Jared Benson Kangwana (born 6 January 1949) is a Kenyan businessman, lawyer, entrepreneur and the Chancellor of the Technical University of Kenya.

== Career ==
Kangwana lectured at Kenya School of Law starting in 1978. He later moved to the University of Nairobi and taught courses about corporate law. During this time, he established a private law firm.

=== Corporate leadership and entrepreneurship ===
In 1983, Kangwana was appointed Chairman of Kenya Times Media Trust. They acquired Nairobi Times, which was renamed Kenya Times and became a daily.

At that time, there was little locally produced content for television broadcast. To fill the void, Kangwana successfully negotiated commercial terms with CNN to receive their broadcast feed on KTN, a first in Africa.
