= Boyd Were =

Kenyan politician

Honourable Boyd Ong'ondo Were

Member of Parliament
- Incumbent
- Assumed office 2 December 2025
- Preceded by: Charles Ong'ondo Were
- Constituency: Kasipul Constituency

Personal details
- Born: 22 April 1998 (age 28)
- Party: Orange Democratic Movement
- Parents: Charles Ong'ondo Were (father); Immaculate Were (mother)
- Education: Co-operative University of Kenya

Boyd Ong'ondo Were (born 22 April 1998) is a Kenyan politician that serves as the current Member of Parliament representing Kasipul Constituency.

== Personal life ==
He is the son of Charles Ong'ondo Were and Immaculate Were who are both deceased.

== Education ==
He did his Kenya Certificate of Primary Education at Kanyakine Boys, his Kenya Certificate of Secondary Education at Saint Patrick's School and graduated with a Bachelor of Science in Finance from The Co-operative University of Kenya in 2020.

== Political life ==
Boyd was sworn in on 2 December 2025, after winning Kasipul's constituency by-election which fell vacant after the assassination of his father on 30 April 2025. Boyd who ran on an ODM ticket defeated his closest rival, Philip Aroko in a by-election that was contested by 10 candidates. He becomes one of the youngest members ever elected to the Kenyan Parliament.
