= Technical University of Košice =

Public university in Slovakia

Coordinates: 48°43′53″N 21°14′41″E

- Technická univerzita v Košiciach
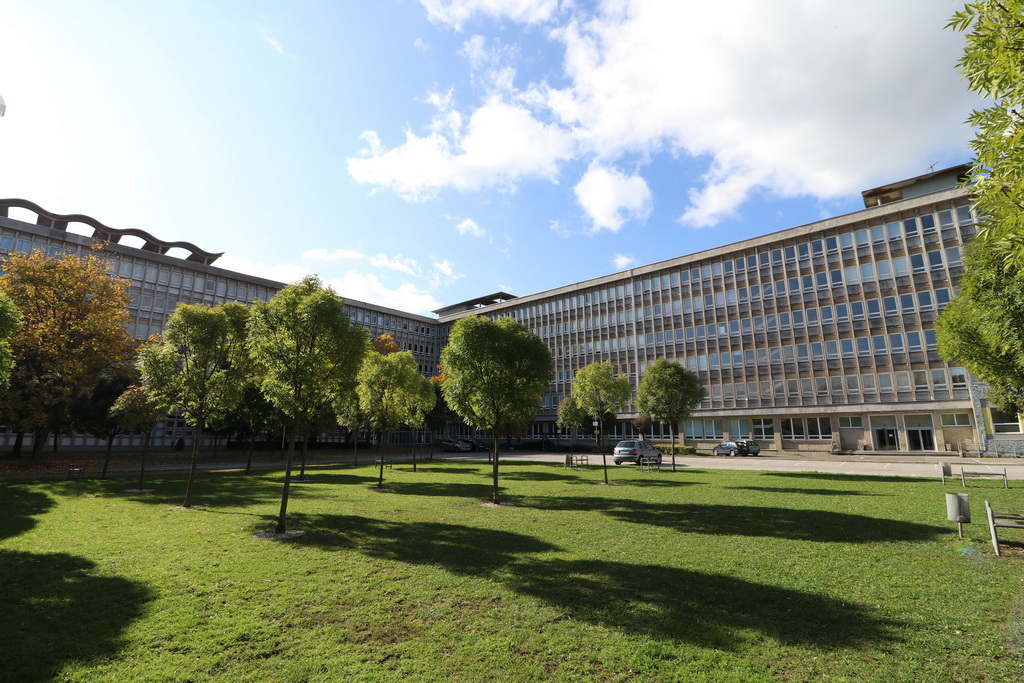
- Type: Public
- Established: 1952
- Affiliations: Division of International Relations and Mobilities
- Rector: prof. Ing. Peter Mésároš, PhD.
- Administrative staff: 700 (educational) + 700 (site clerical)
- Students: 9,500 + 400 (postgraduate)
- Location: Letná 9, 042 00 Košice, Slovak Republic, Europe, Košice, Slovakia
- Nickname: TUKE
- Website: tuke.sk

University rankings

Regional – Overall
- QS Emerging Europe and Central Asia: 99 (2022)

Technical University of Košice (Slovak: Technická univerzita v Košiciach) is the second largest university of technology in Slovakia.

== History ==
The Technical University of Košice was founded in 1952, but its roots must be sought much deeper in the past. As early as 1657, the Universitas Cassoviensis was established in Košice (Kassa), but technical education in the Kingdom of Hungary was only elevated to higher education level in 1762, when Maria Theresa, sovereign of Hungary, established the Mining Academy in Banská Štiavnica (Selmecbánya). This provided education and promoted research activity in a group of scientific disciplines ranging from ore mining through to production and processing of metal materials.

The origins of higher technical education in Košice reach back to 1937, when the M. R. Štefánik State Technical College was established in the city. Teaching was supposed to start in the academic year 1938/39, but the pre-war events following the Vienna Arbitration caused the college to be moved first to Prešov, then to Martin and finally to Bratislava, where it remained and later formed the basis for the Slovak Technical University in Bratislava.

The true birth of the Košice Technical College came on 8 July 1952, when the Czechoslovak Government issued Directive No. 30/1952 Statutes setting up three faculties, namely the Faculties of Heavy Engineering, Mining and Metallurgy. These were joined in 1969 by the Faculty of Electrical Engineering and in 1978 by the Faculty of Civil Engineering. The important event of the renaming of the College into the Technical University of Košice occurred on 13 February 1991. In 1992 the Faculty of Professional Studies was set up in Prešov, which was transformed in 1996 into today’s Faculty of Manufacturing Technologies.

The year 1992 also saw the introduction of the Faculty of Economics, which meant that the University outgrew its original framework of purely technical disciplines, and it continued in this trend in 1998 with the founding of the present-day Faculty of Arts.

The Faculty of Aeronautics of the Technical University of Košice was established on 1 February 2005 as the successor of the Military Aviation Academy of General Milan Rastislav Štefánik in Košice, which had provided university education for pilots and aviation technical personnel for 30 years.

The Technical University of Košice (TUKE) is a research and education institution that provides education and smart solutions for various areas of life. TUKE has been ranked in the world’s top university rankings, such as: QS World University Rankings, in which TUKE ranked for the first time and in the top 1000, URAP-University Ranking by Academic Performance, SCIMAGO, Webometrics and others. With a total area of 43 hectares and with three campuses in two regional cities, it is one of the largest universities in Slovakia. Thanks to the interconnection of its nine faculties with a diverse focus, TUKE creates a unique environment for thousands of students. More than 10 per cent of them are foreign students from 40 countries. TUKE offers a wide range of appealing study programs. It works closely with other educational institutions and industrial facilities at home and abroad (95 university partnerships with 27 countries and 281 valid agreements enabling mobility of our teachers and students within the Erasmus+ program to 31 countries). The support of young innovators is covered by the University Science Park TECHNICOM through the TUKE Startup Centre and TUKE Incubator. TUKE also offers other extra-curricular activities which are worth mentioning: more than 30 kinds of sports, choir, ensemble, student television, radio, and AIESEC, AZU, BEST and IAESTE membership.

TUKE caters for a wide range of educational needs not only in the East-Slovak region, but throughout Slovakia and Central Europe, as in many specializations it is the only centre of education and research in this area.

== University Structure ==
- Faculty of Mining, Ecology, Process Control and Geotechnology
- Faculty of Materials, Metallurgy and Recycling
- Faculty of Mechanical Engineering
- Faculty of Electrical Engineering and Informatics
- Faculty of Civil Engineering
- Faculty of Economics
- Faculty of Manufacturing Technologies
- Faculty of Arts
- Faculty of Aeronautics

== Rankings ==
University rankings

Global – Overall
- THE World: 801-1000

In 2017, Times Higher Education ranked the university within the 801-1000 band globally.

== Gallery ==
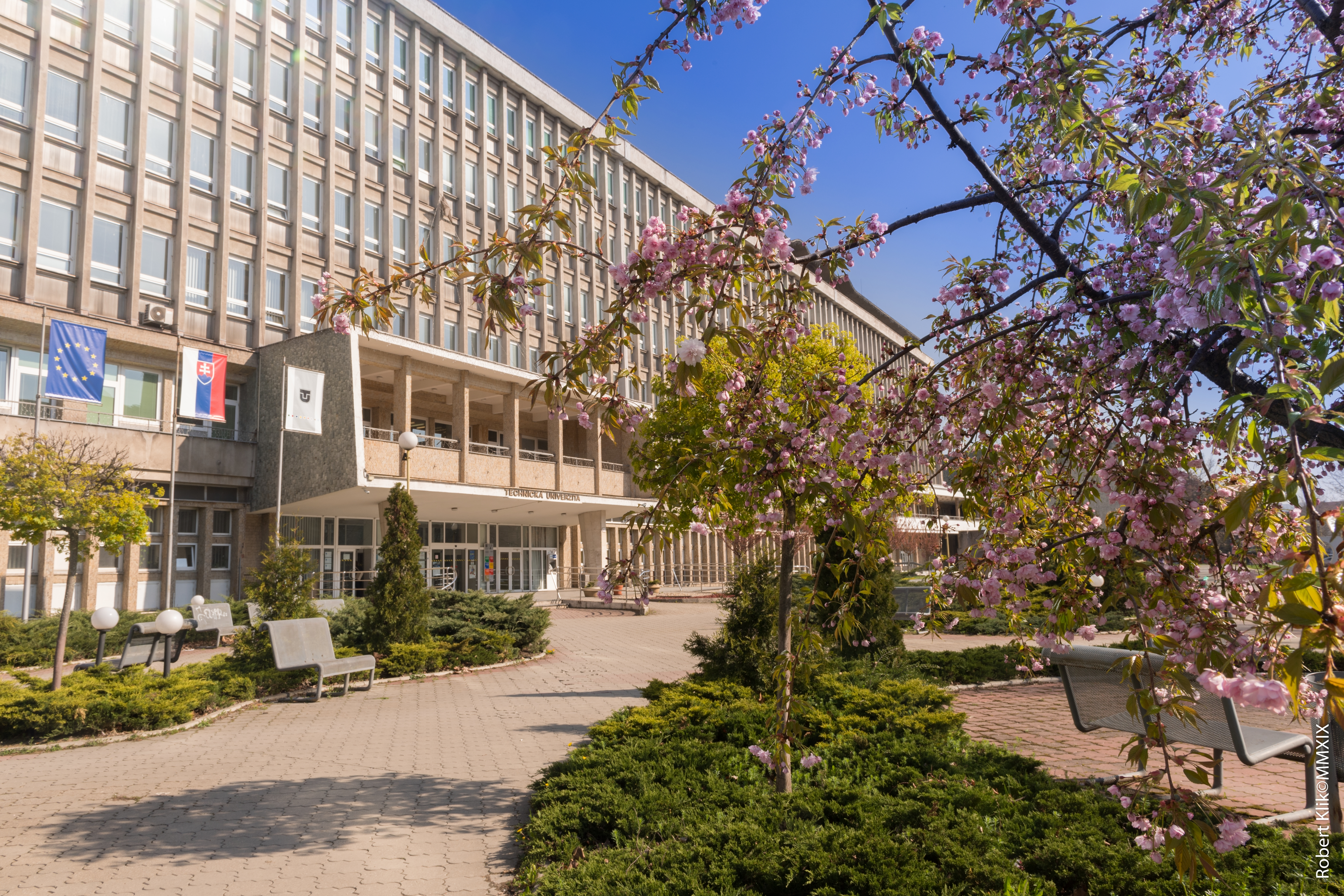
Main Campus

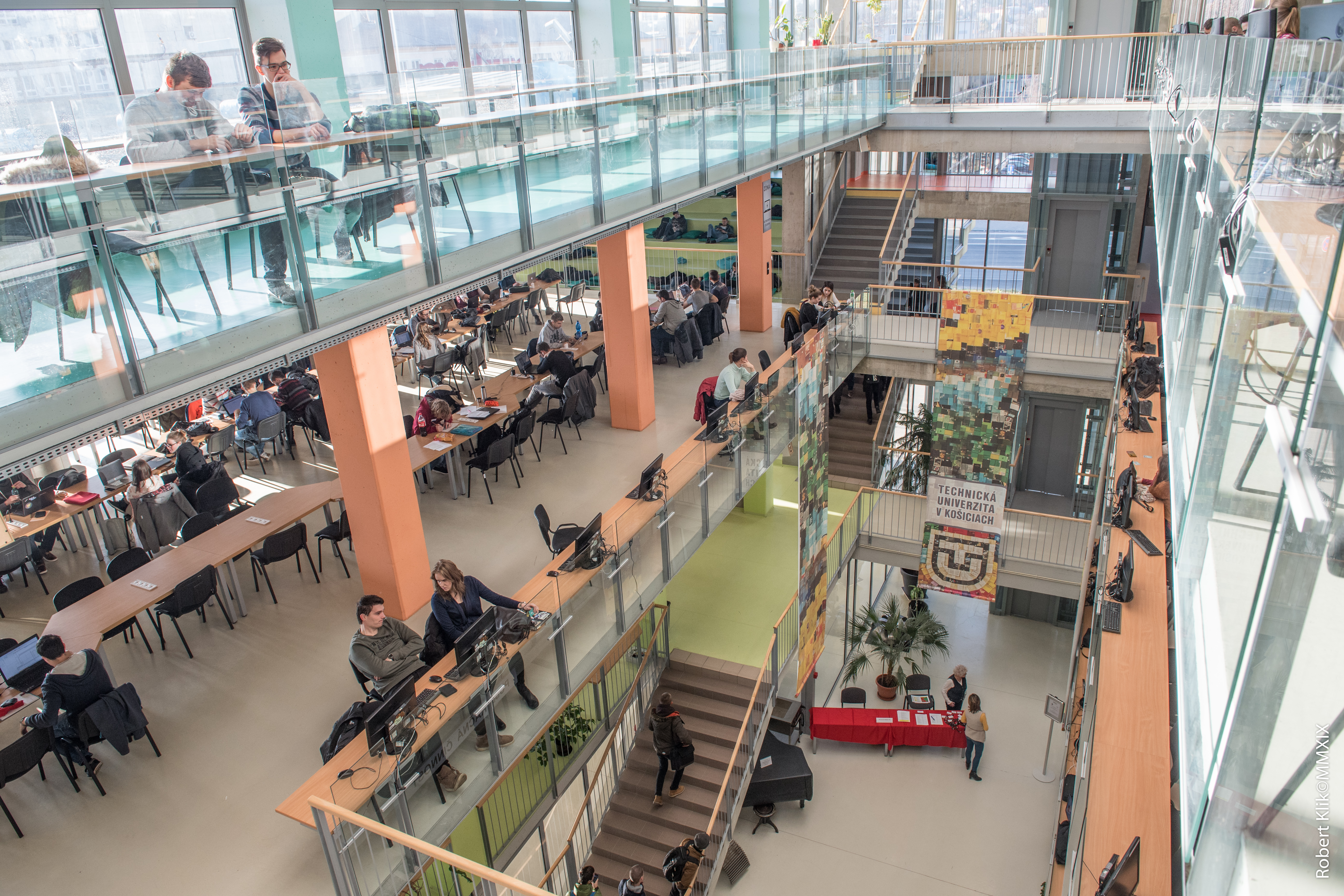
TUKE Library

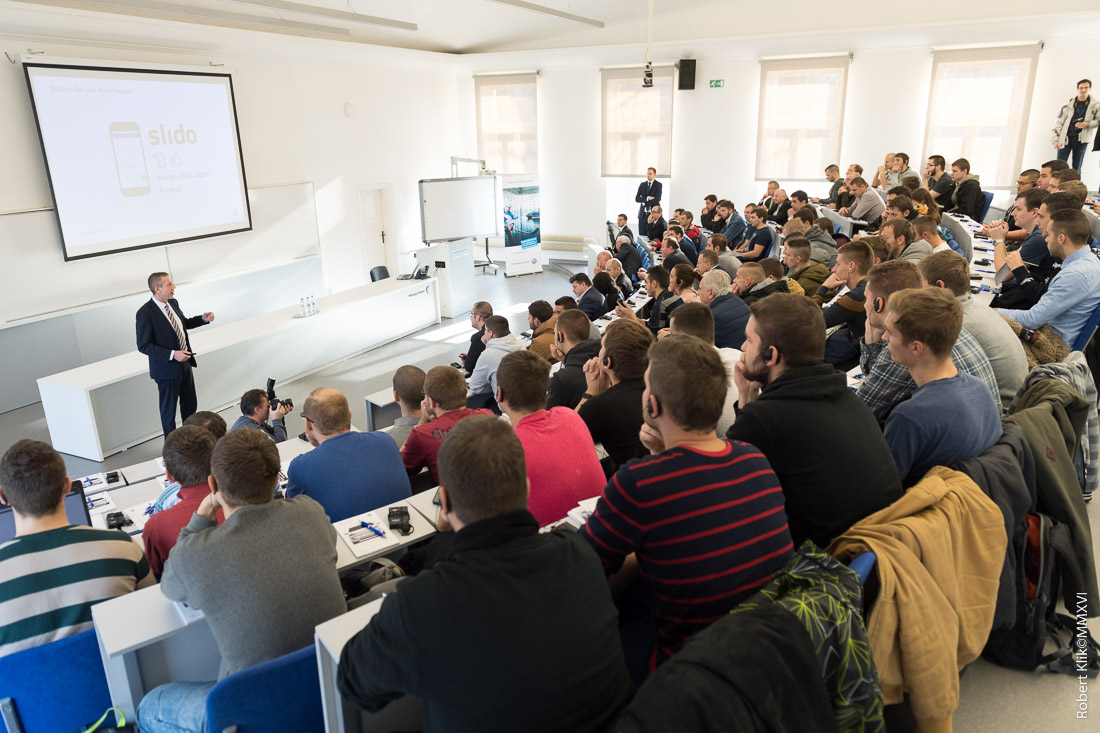
Lecture in Hall of Physics

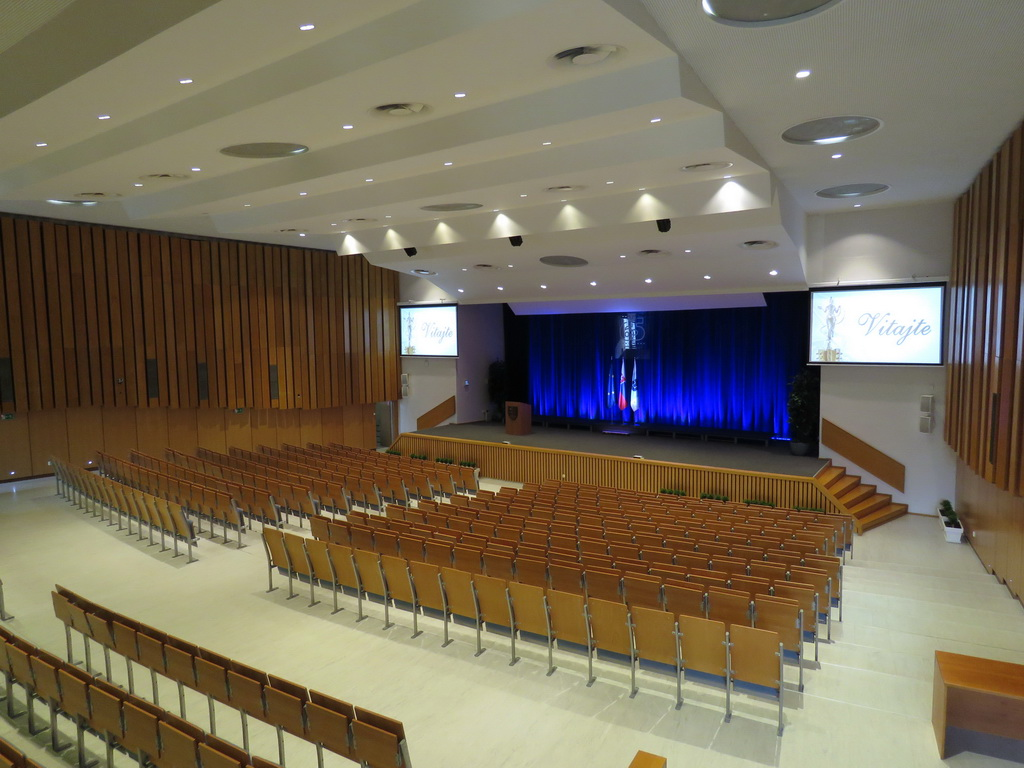
Aula Maxima

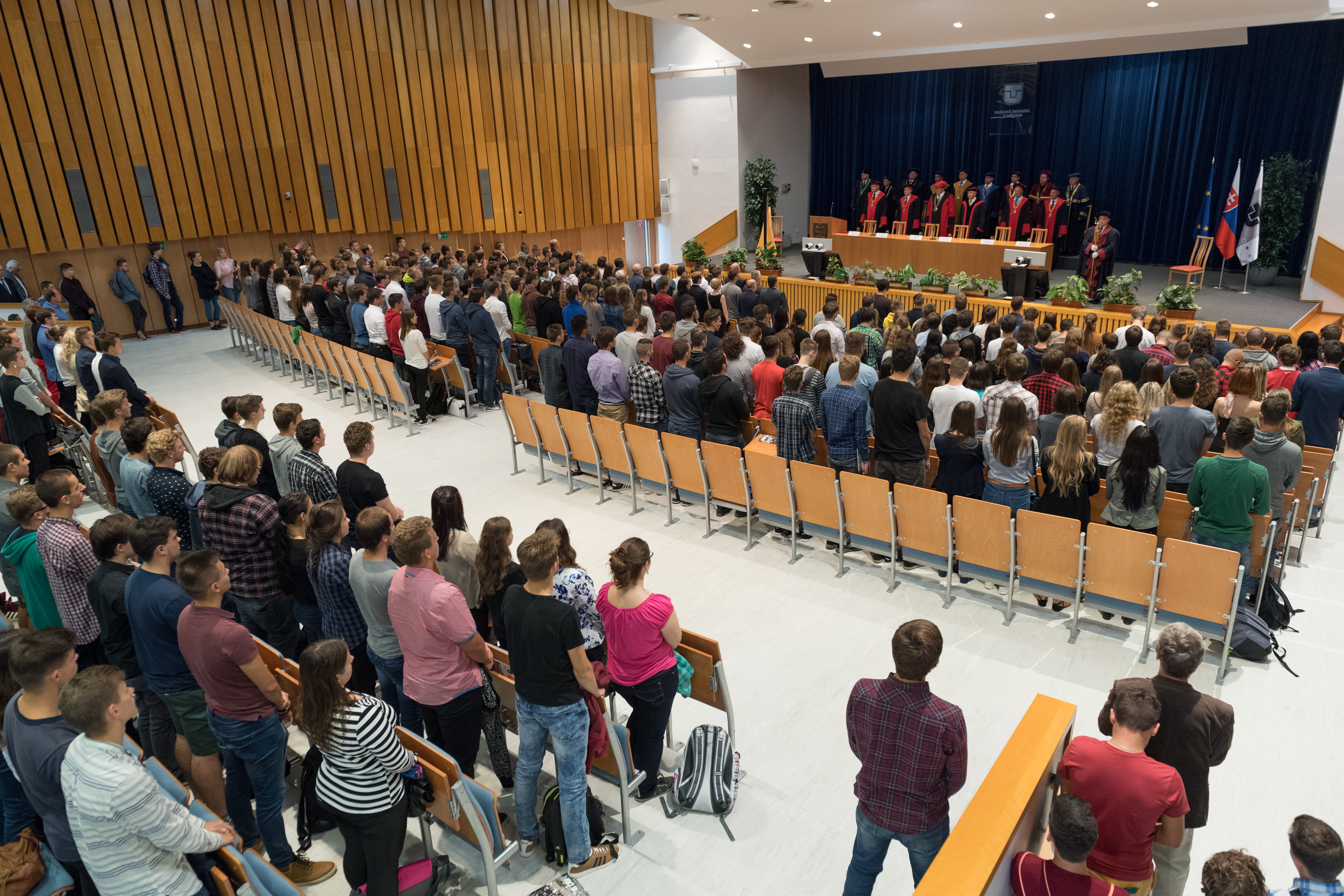
Aula Maxima

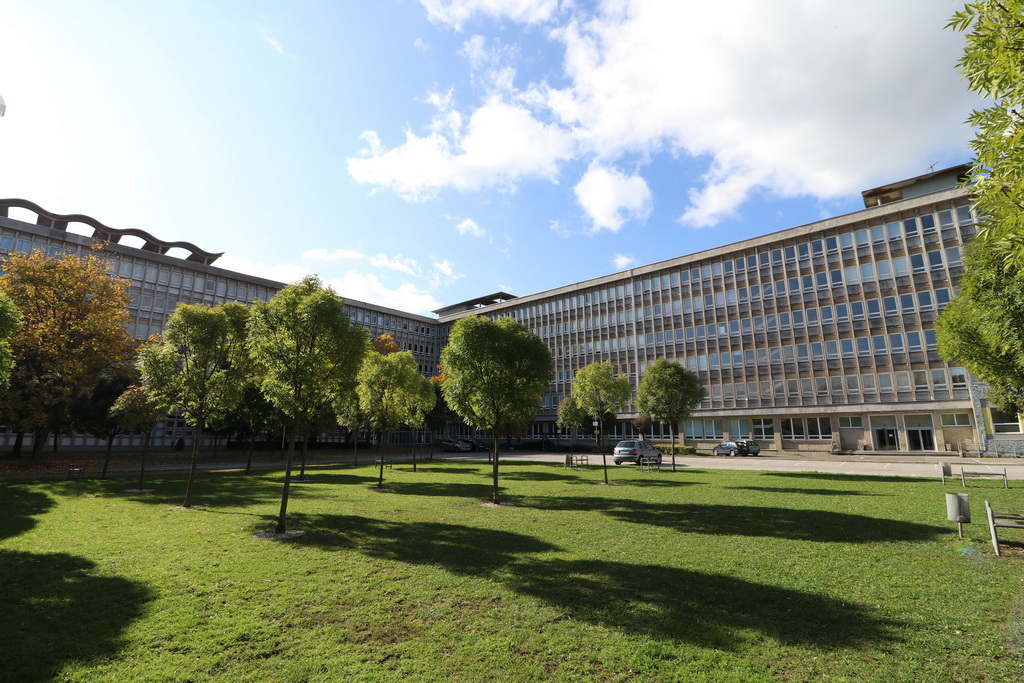
Main Campus

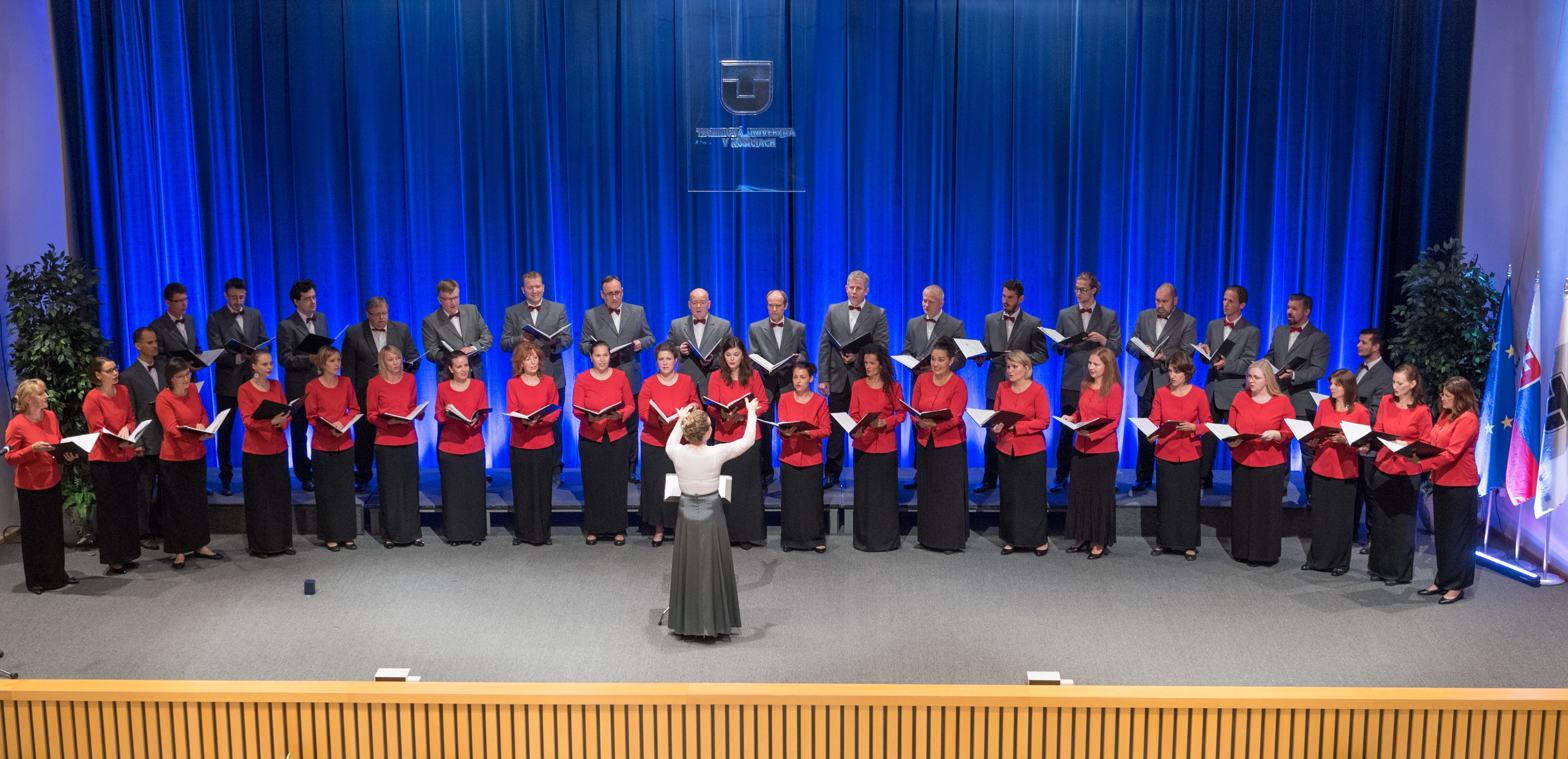
Collegium Technicum

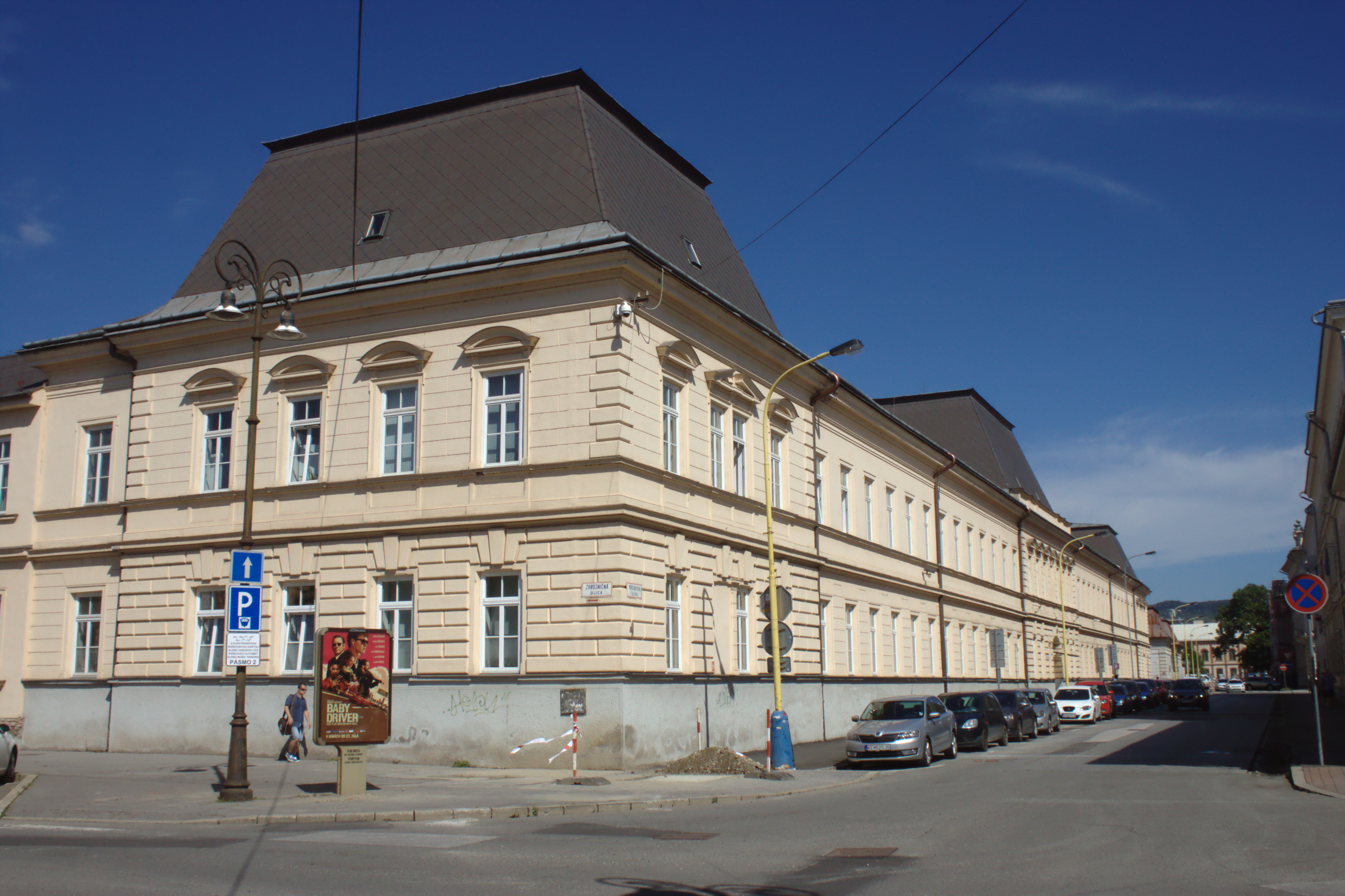
TUKE Zbrojničná

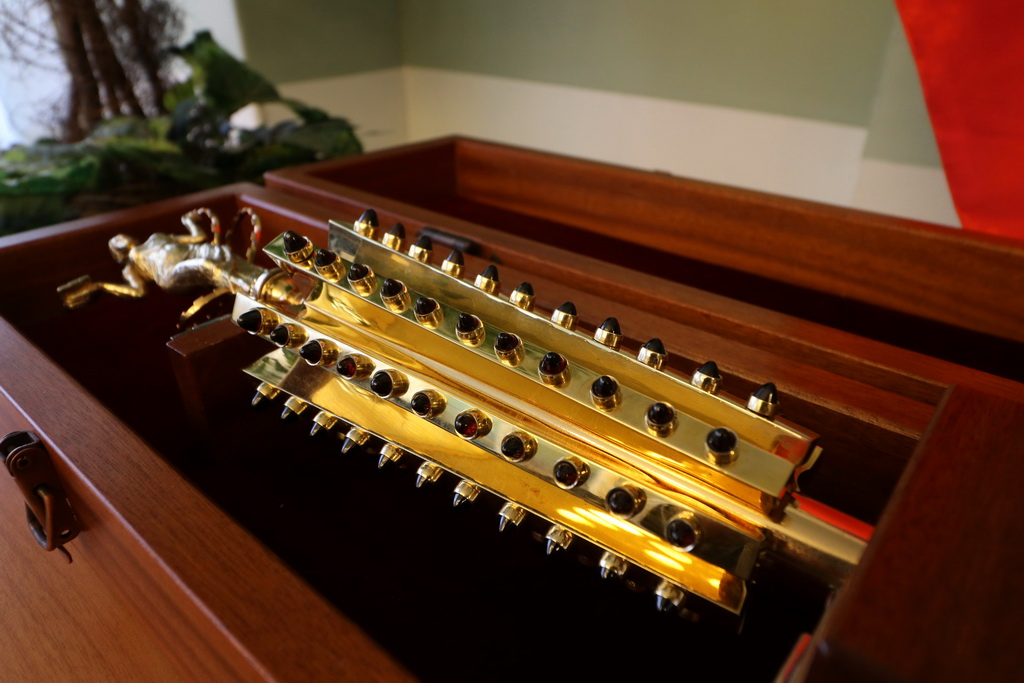
TUKE insígnie

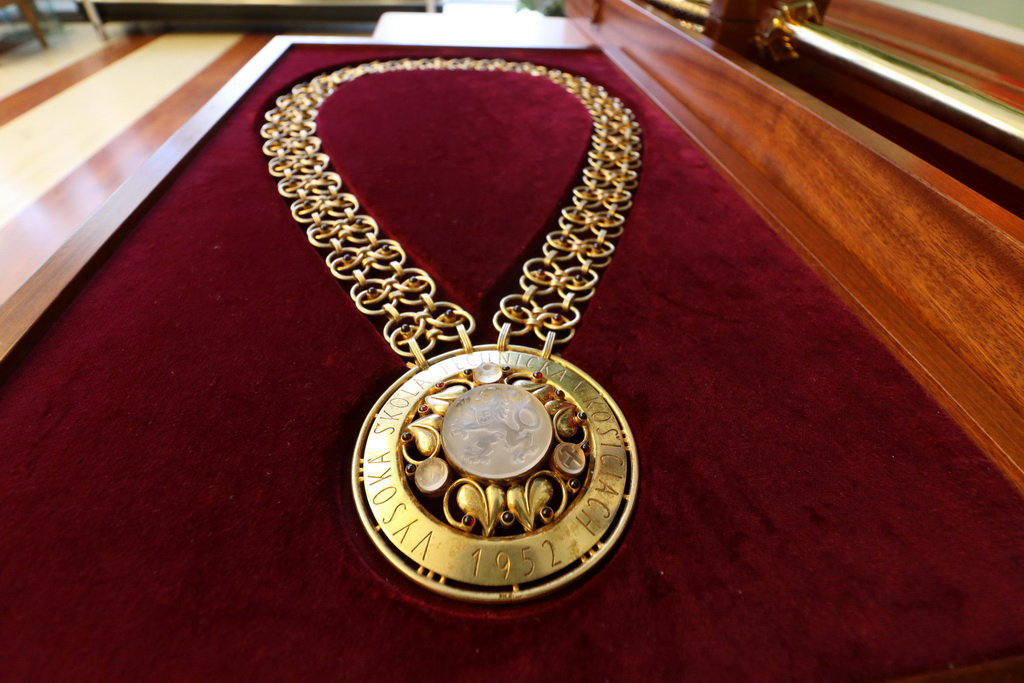
TUKE insígnie

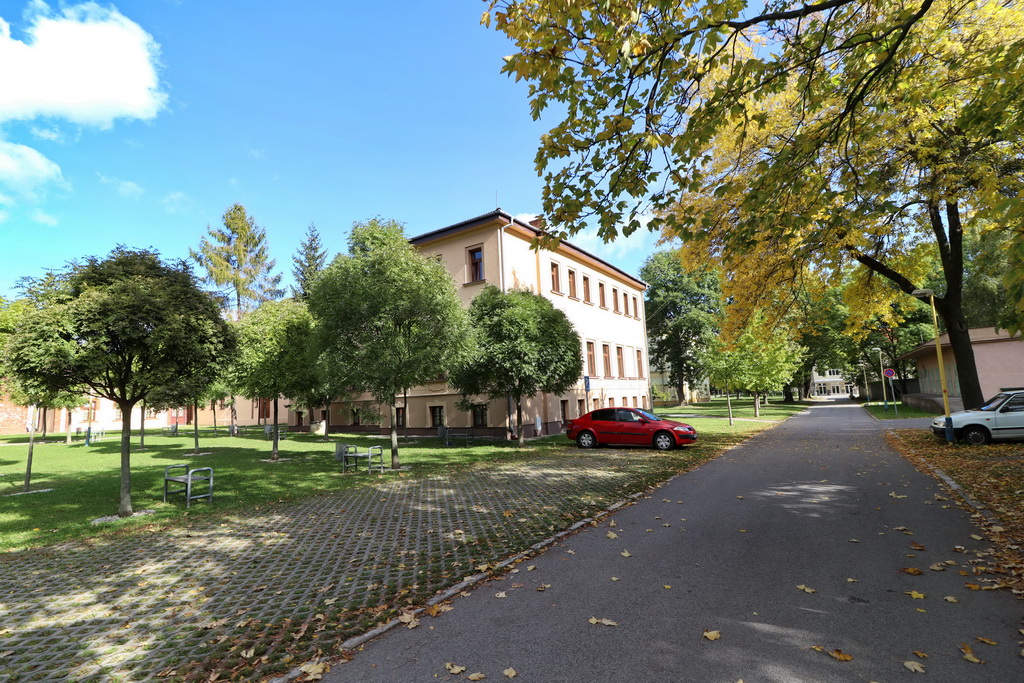
TUKE park

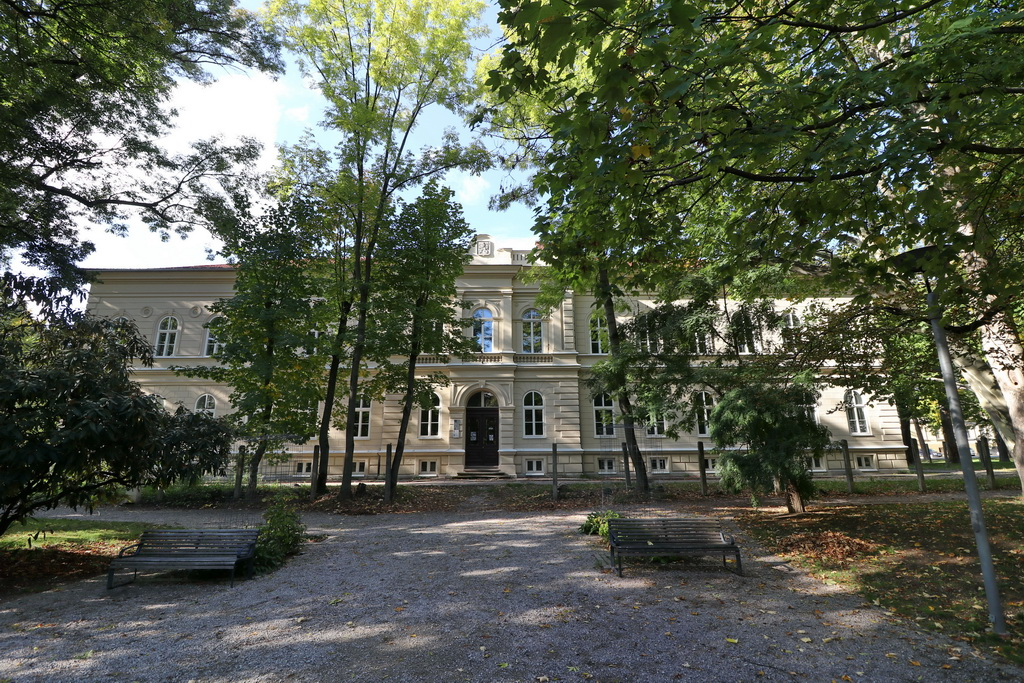
TUKE park 2

== See also ==
Technical University of Kenya
