= Kodera =

Kodera (written: 小寺) is a Japanese surname. Notable people with the surname include:

- Asami Kodera (小寺 麻美; born 1978), Japanese mixed martial artist
- Takehiro Kodera (小寺 武大; born 1978), Japanese speedskater

== See also ==
- Kōdera, Hyōgo, a former town in Kanzaki District, Hyōgo Prefecture, Japan
