= Moses Rugut =

Research scientist

Prof. Moses Rugutt
- Born: 22 August 1956 (age 70); Motero, Soliat, Kericho County
- Education: University of Nairobi, University of Edinburgh, University of Glasgow
- Occupation: Research Scientist
- Honours: Head of State Commendation, HSC, Order of the Grand Warrior, OGW

Prof. Moses Kipng'eno Rugutt OGW (born 22 August 1956) is a Kenyan Research Scientist and the immediate former (year 2020) Chief Executive Officer of the National Commission for Science, Technology and Innovation Prof. Rugutt was appointed to the position in 2014 having served in other senior positions in the Government of Kenya.

== Early life ==
Rugutt was born in Soliat Location, Soin Division in the then Kericho District.

== Education ==
He attended St. Patricks High School, then in Elgeyo Marakwet County for his Secondary Education and proceeded to University of Nairobi to pursue Bachelor of Science in Veterinary Medicine (1983). He holds a Master of Science in Tropical Veterinary Science from the University of Edinburgh (1992) and a PhD in Veterinary Parasitology from the University of Glasgow (1999).

== Public Service ==
Rugutt has served in various positions in the public service among them sitting in several boards over time. He sat in the Board of National Quality Control Laboratory, Kenya Agricultural & Livestock Research Organization, Committee Member on Drug Registration at Pharmacy & Poisons Board since 1999 and National Museums of Kenya.

He also served as the Principal Research Scientist of the defunct KARI that was de-gazetted and was succeeded by a newly established state agency KALRO and as Chief Research Officer at the Ministry of Higher Education, Science and Technology before being appointed the Deputy Secretary at the National Council for Science and Technology which was the predecessor of the National Commission for Science, Technology and Innovation. He later served as the Deputy Director General of the National Commission of Science of Technology upon its establishment in 2013. He was awarded Head of State's Commendations in the year 2008 for his distinguished service to the nation and subsequently awarded with the Order of the Grand Warrior, OGW in the year 2016.

== Publications ==
Prof. Rugutt has authored several publications alongside other authors and have been published in local, regional and international journals. Some of his publications are as follows:

- Seroepidemiological survey of Taenia saginata cysticercosis in Kenya.
- Diagnosis of Taenia saginata cysticercosis in Kenyan cattle by antibody and antigen ELISA.
- Anthelmintic resistance amongst sheep and goats in Kenya.
- Epidemiology and control of ruminant helminths in the Kericho Highlands of Kenya.
