= Meru University of Science and Technology =

University in Kenya

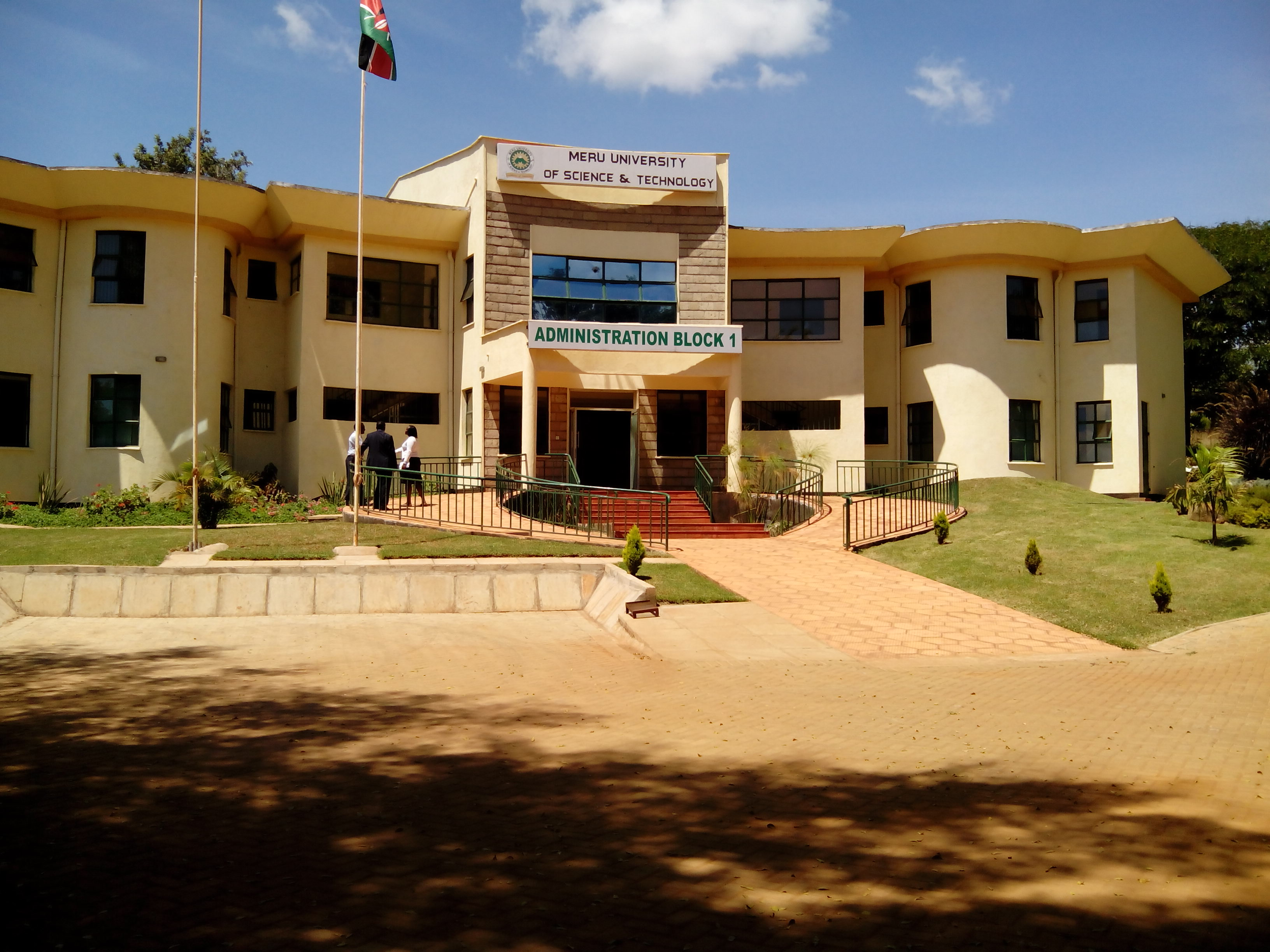
- Administration block 1
- Type: Public
- Established: 1979 as Meru College of Technology (MECOTECH)
- Chairperson: Prof. James Ireri Kanya
- Chancellor: Dr. Peter Ndegwa, CEO Safaricom
- Vice-Chancellor: Prof. Romanus Odhiambo Otieno.
- Location: Meru, Meru County, Kenya
- Campus: MUST Main Campus, Meru Town Campus
- Website: www.must.ac.ke

Meru University of Science and Technology (or MUST) is a public university in Tigania West Constituency Meru, Kenya. It is in Meru County, 15 kilometres northeast of Meru Town, along the Meru-Makutano-Maua Highway.

== A Brief History ==
Meru University of Science and Technology (MUST) originated in the 1960s from a vision by Ameru leaders, including the Njuri Ncheke Council of Elders, to establish a higher learning institution. The community contributed 641 acres of land near the Njuri Ncheke Shrine at Nchiru for this purpose.

Community efforts to raise funds and resources led to the founding of Meru College of Technology (MECOTECH), which welcomed its first students in 1983. MECOTECH offered a range of Diploma and Certificate courses, including Agriculture, Motor Vehicle Engineering, Building and Construction Management, IT, Business Administration, Electrical Engineering, and Masonry.

On July 1, 2008, MECOTECH was upgraded to Meru University College of Science and Technology, operating as a constituent college of JKUAT. It gained full university status on March 1, 2013. To fill the gap left by MECOTECH, the government established a modern technical institute at Karumo, Athwana-Tigania West, to offer foundational technical skills to students not pursuing university education.

MUST's mandate, as outlined in its charter, is to provide Kenyans with educational opportunities in diverse fields such as Innovation, Entrepreneurship, Public Health, Biological Sciences, Agriculture, Physical Sciences, Education, Engineering, and Technology among others.

== Academics ==
Meru University of Science and Technology offers courses in Engineering, Agriculture, Education, Science, Information Technology and Business, and has the following campuses and schools:

== Schools ==
1. School of Agriculture and Food Sciences (SAFS)
2. School of Business and Economics (SBE)
3. School of Computing and Informatics (SCI)
4. School of Education (SED)
5. School of Engineering and Architecture (SEA)
6. School of Health Sciences (SHS)
7. School of Nursing (SON)
8. School of Pure and Applied Sciences (SPAS)

== Campuses ==
- Main Campus - 15 km from Meru Town along Meru Maua Road and opposite the Njuri Ncheke shrine. It is 5 km from Kianjai Market.
- Meru Town Campus
- Marimba Campus

== Library ==
Reuben Marambii Library has 30,000 print materials with 80,000 items in electronic and online resources. It has a sitting capacity of 500 people. The library has an Online Public Access Catalog offering services such as searching, renewing books, making purchase suggestions, placing holds on items among others. More information about the library and services offered can be found at library.must.ac.ke. The library has developed off-campus access to e-books and e-journals to allow users to access subscribed online resources.

== Administration ==
- Chairman of the Council -Prof. James Ireri Kanya
- Chancellor - Dr. Peter Ndegwa (CEO, Safaricom)
- Vice-chancellor - Prof. Romanus Odhiambo Otieno (vice-chancellor)
- Deputy vice-chancellor (academics) - Prof. Simon Taalia Thuranira
- Deputy vice-chancellor (administration, finance and planning) - Prof. Hilda Nyougo Omae
- Finance officer - CPA Nephat Njeru
- Registrar (administration and planning) - Dr Elijah Walubuka
- Registrar (academic research and students' welfare) - Dr Stephen Mbugua Karanja

== See also ==
- Maasai Mara University
