= Kasipul Constituency =

Kenyan electoral constituency

Kasipul
- constituency for the Parliament of Kenya
- County: Homa Bay

Current constituency
- Created: 2013
- Number of members: One
- Party: ODM
- Member of Parliament: Boyd Were
- Created from: Kasipul Kabondo

Kasipul is a constituency in Kenya. It is one of eight constituencies in Homa Bay County.

== History ==
Kasipul constituency was established from the 2010 constitution with the code number 245 from Kasipul kabondo constituency and Kabondo constituency formed the other half.

== Wards ==
Kasipul constituency has five wards namely: East Kamagak, West Kamagak, South Kasipul, West Kasipul and Central Kasipul.

Ward Name	Ward Code	Sub-Locations
West Kasipul	1221	Kadel Kamidigo, Kodera Kamiyawa, Kotieno Kochich, Kotieno Konuonga, Kadel Karabach
South Kasipul	1222	Kanyango, Kawino, Kasimba, Kokal
Central Kasipul	1223	Kawere East, Kawere West, North Kachien, Nyalenda, South Kachien
East Kamagak	1224	Kachieng, Sino Kagola
West Kamagak	1225	Kamuma, Obisa

== Members of Parliament ==
Election	Member of Parliament	Party	Notes
2013	Joseph Oyugi Magwanga	ODM	Constituency established
2017	Ong'ondo Were	ODM	
2022	Ong'ondo Were	ODM	
2025	Boyd Were	ODM	By-election

Honourable Charles Ong'ondo Were was gunned down by gunmen on a motorbike at City Mortuary Roundabout on 30 April 2025. Boyd Were Ong'ondo, one of Charles Were's sons, was elected as its new Member of Parliament and sworn in on 2 December 2025.
