= Joseph Oyugi Magwanga =

Kenyan politician

Joseph Oyugi Magwanga is a Kenyan politician. He belongs to the NASA Movement and was elected to represent the Kasipul Kabondo Constituency in the National Assembly of Kenya since the 2007 Kenyan parliamentary election. he has been viewed by the constituents as one of the best performing member of parliament.

He ran for a gubernatorial seat in 2017 in Homa Bay county and lost to Awiti Cyprian .

He was involved in a traffic accident in January 2010 in Chepsir, near Kericho, on the way to his home village Wasweta. His wife Judith Atieno died in the accident.

He served as the Deputy Governor for Homabay county following their successful election in 2022 together with Governor Gladys Wanga until his resignation from the post on 26 February 2026.
