= Technical University of Kenya =

Public university in Nairobi, Kenya

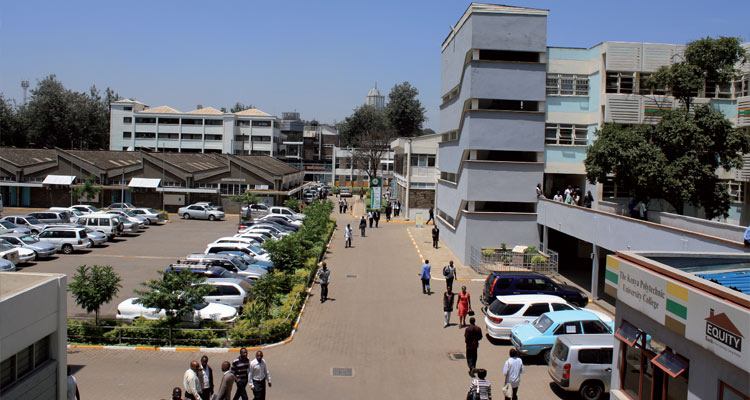
- Motto: "Education and Training for the Real World"
- Type: Public
- Established: 1956 – Kenya Technical Institute; 1961 – Kenya Polytechnic; 2007 – Kenya Polytechnic University College; 2013 – Technical University of Kenya
- Chancellor: Jared Benson Kangwana
- Vice-Chancellor: Prof. Benedict Mwavu Mutua
- Total staff: 1,600 Admin and Academic Staff
- Location: Nairobi, Kenya
- Campus: Urban
- Website: tukenya.ac.ke

Technical University of Kenya (TU-K) is a public university in Nairobi, Kenya. It was chartered in January 2013 by then-president Mwai Kibaki.

== History ==
Technical University of Kenya grew out of the Kenya Polytechnic. The Kenya Polytechnic was founded in 1961. Proposals for the establishment of a technical institute in Nairobi were put forward in the Willoughby Report published in 1949. This led to the creation of the Royal Technical College of East Africa (RTCEA).

The objective was to establish a technical college in Nairobi which would offer education and training at the technician and semi-professional levels for the three East African territories of Kenya, Uganda, and Tanganyika. It was then important that in each of the territories there should be students sufficiently qualified to join RTCEA. While Uganda and Tanganyika established technical institutes in Kampala and Dar es Salaam to prepare candidates to join RTCEA, Kenya opted to introduce class streams under the name Kenya Technical Institute (KTI) at RTCEA.

By 1960 it had been decided that the Royal Technical College of East Africa should expand its mandate to offer degrees. Thus in 1960, the RTCEA was granted the mandate to offer degrees of the University of London under a special arrangement. Under this new status, the college had its name changed to the Royal College Nairobi.

As the college had its mandate expanded, it was no longer possible to continue accommodating the students of the Kenya Technical Institute due to pressure on space. Consequently, the Kenya Technical Institute needed to be moved to a site of its own. At the same time it was considered that the Diploma programmes should be moved away from RTCEA to Kenya Technical Institute. Consequently, in order to offer as well training at the level of Diploma, the Government established the Kenya Polytechnic out of the Kenya Technical Institute.

The Kenya Polytechnic established itself for the training of middle level manpower in the country. It is located in the Nairobi central business district opposite the Times Tower and along Haile Selassie Avenue next to the City Square Post Office. It offers TVET (Technical and Vocational Education and Training) programmes as well as the degree programmes. Among the programmes offered at TU-K are: DipTech, BTech, BPhil, BEng and BSc.

== Recent degree launches ==
In July 2009, the university college had the first batch of the programmes of study approved by Senate at the University of Nairobi. The curricula are in the areas of electrical and electronic engineering and comprise the Bachelor of Engineering (B. Eng. in Electrical and Electronic Engineering, Bachelor of Technology (B.Tech.) in Electrical and Electronic Engineering Technology, and the Diploma in Technology (Dip. Tech.) in Electrical and Electronic Engineering.

The programmes are designed to cover respectively five, four, and three years of study for the B.Eng., B.Tech., and Dip. Tech. The first cohort of degree students joined the college in January 2009 and a section of whom has since satisfied the Board of Examiners and has been recommended for conferment of their degrees in the convocation of 2011.

== Faculties ==
=== Faculty of Engineering and Built Environment ===
- School of Architecture and the Built Environment
- School of Electrical and Electronic Engineering
- School of Infrastructure and Resource Engineering
- School of Mechanical and Process Engineering
- School of Surveying and Geospatial Sciences
- Centre for Engineering Innovation and Production
- School of Engineering Science and Technology
- School of Information and Communication Technology

=== Faculty of Applied Science and Technology ===
- School of Biological and Life Sciences
- School of Computing and Information Technologies
- School of Health Sciences and Technology
- School of Mathematics and Actuarial Science
- School of Physical Sciences and Technology
- Centre for Science and Technology Studies
- School of Pure and Applied Sciences

=== Faculty of Social Sciences and Technology ===
- School of Business and Management Studies
- School of Creative Arts and Technologies
- School of Hospitality and Tourism Studies ~~Management~~
- School of Social and Development Studies ~~Technology Studies~~
- School of Information and Communication Studies

== Notable alumni ==
- Amos Kipngeno Misik (1991–1992, Marketing), retired Kenya Prisons Commander

== See also ==
- PC Kinyanjui Technical Training Institute
- Technical University of Košice
- Kenya Polytechnic Handball Club
