= Kabondo =

Kadongo
- Location within Kenya
- Coordinates: 0.45°S 34.88°E
- Country: Kenya
- County: Homa Bay County
- Time zone: UTC+3 (EAT)
- Climate: Am

Kabondo is a settlement in Kenya's Homa Bay County.
