= Agoro Sare High School =

Public high school in Oyugis, Homa Bay County, Kenya

- Agosir

Location
- Kisii-Kisumu Road; Oyugis, Homa Bay County, 40222; Kenya; 0.5035°S 34.7345°E

Information
- Other name: ASHS
- Type: Public high school
- Motto: Labour to Success
- Established: 1958; 68 years ago
- Principal: Mr. Isaac Okeyo
- Grades: forms 1,2,3,4
- Gender: Boys
- Language: English Kiswahili
- Campus type: Urban
- Colours: Red, white, gold and black
- Athletics conference: KSSSA
- Mascot: Three Star
- Yearbook: The Dawn
- Website: www.agorosarehs.sc.ke

Agoro Sare High School (ASHS) is a public high school for boys located in Oyugis, Homa Bay County, Kenya. It was established in 1958 and is currently categorized as a National School meaning a portion of students from outside the county can be enrolled into the institution.

== Athletics ==
The school competes in the Kenya Secondary Schools Sports Association (KSSSA), as a secondary school in Kenya. In 2019, Term 1 games, Agoro Sare High beat arch rivals Maseno High School in Nyanza Regional Basketball contest to become the new 2019 Champions.

== Notable alumni ==
- Evans Kidero, politician
