= Kendu Bay =

Coordinates: 0°22′S 34°39′E

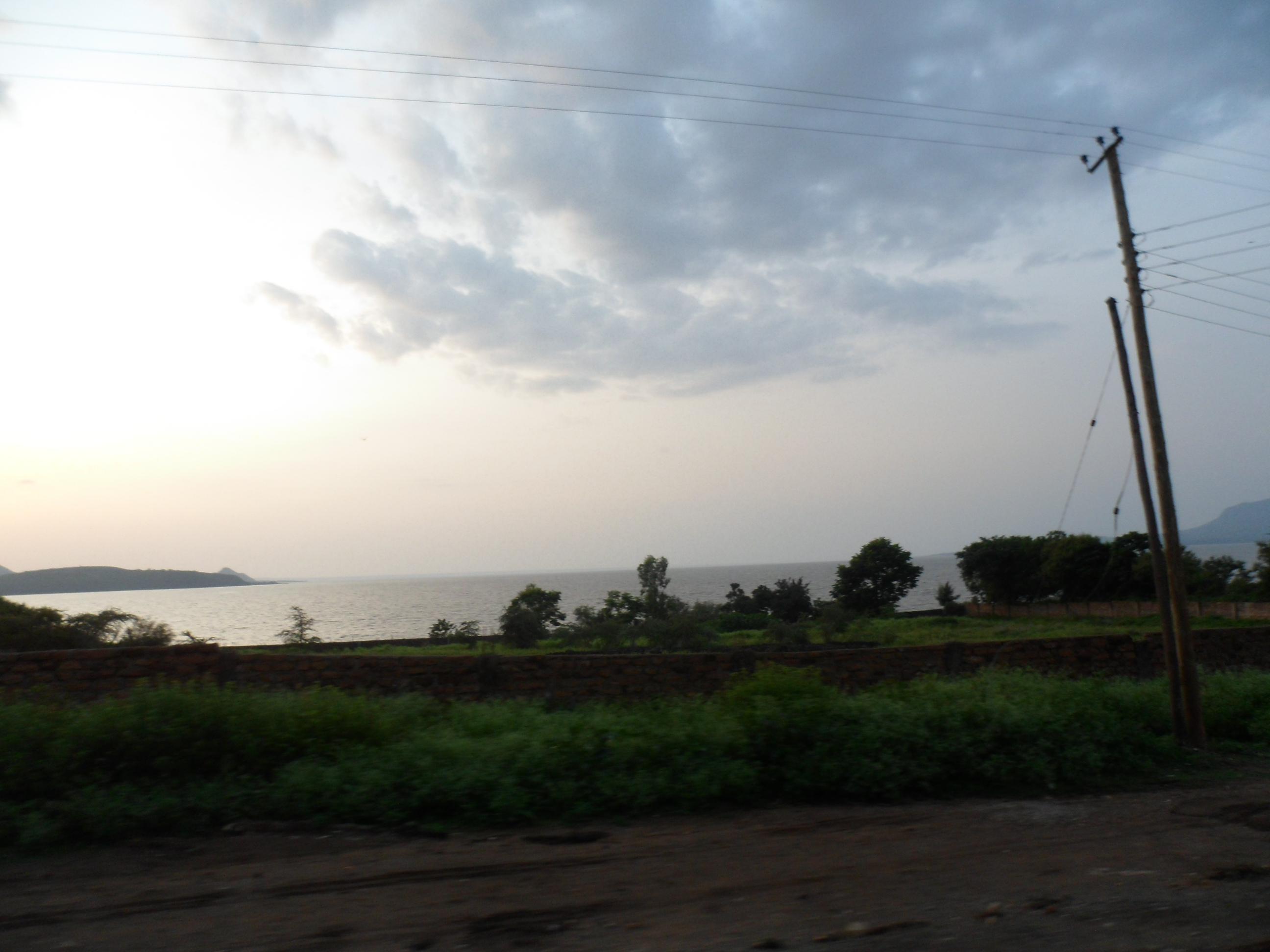
Lake Victoria near Kendu Bay

Kendu Bay is a bay and town in Kenya. The area is the part of Rachuonyo North District in Homa Bay County.

== Overview ==
It is located at the shores of Lake Victoria along Katito-Homa-Bay road. It is the headquarters of the district. Kisumu, the largest urban centre and city in Kenya's western region, is located 40 kilometres north of Kendu Bay, but the route to Kisumu, which goes via Ahero, is much longer as it circumvents Winam Gulf in between kisumu- Ahero- Katito- Kendu Bay is 70km from Kisumu city. Kendu Bay is also linked by a road to Homa Bay, located 30 kilometres southwest.

Kendu Bay forms a town council with a population of 29,638 (1999 census). Kendu Bay town council has four wards: Gendia/Awach, Gumba/Jieri, Rambira and Simbi/Kogembo. All of them are located within Karachuonyo Constituency. Kendu Bay is also headquarters of East Karachuonyo division of Rachuonyo District.

The area is the birthplace of Barack Obama Sr., the father of U.S. President Barack Obama, and his parents Hussein Onyango Obama and Habiba Akumu Nyanjoga. The senior Obama was raised in Alego.

For many years Kendu Bay (called "Kanyasoro" by the locals) was known as the entertainment capital of Nyanza, with its famed 'Kendu Show', which attracted musicians and bands from all over Kenya. However, the show has waned and disappeared over the years. Today the show-ground is a mere relic of its illustrious past, as is the Old pier that used to be an important port of call for steamers and ships from as far as Uganda and Tanzania.

The area residents proud themselves of the historical "Lake Simbi" situated few kilometers from Kendu Bay Town off Homabay-Katito road. It is an alkaline lake and the villagers believe that the waters are curative to any skin diseases among other interesting stories revolving around its formation.

"Lake Simbi is a tiny Crater Lake measuring about one kilometre in radius. Both Lake Simbi and adjacent Odango sites support a substantial bird population that includes flamingos, little grebes, little egrets and Egyptian geese, making it a haven for bird watchers." http://www.kws.go.ke/content/lake-simbi-national-sanctuary

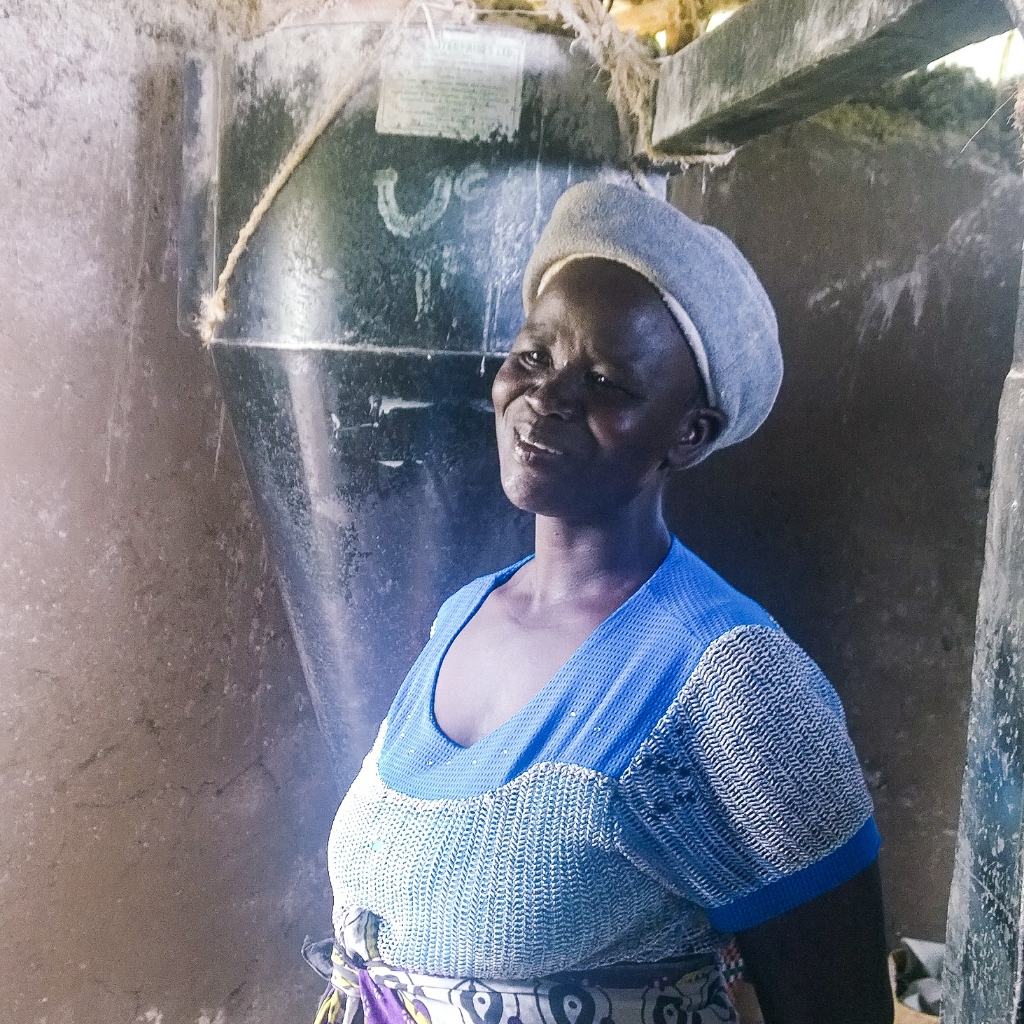
Posho mill at the bay

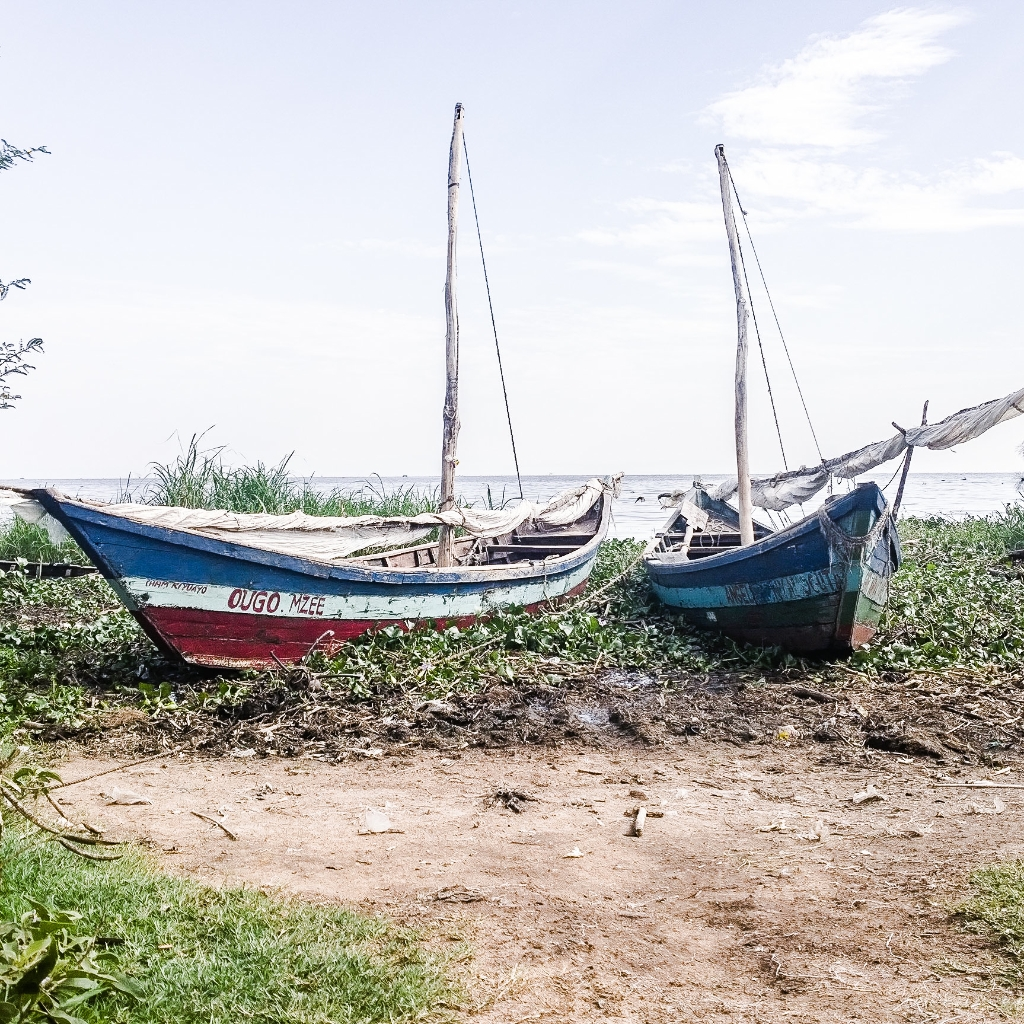
Boats by the Bay

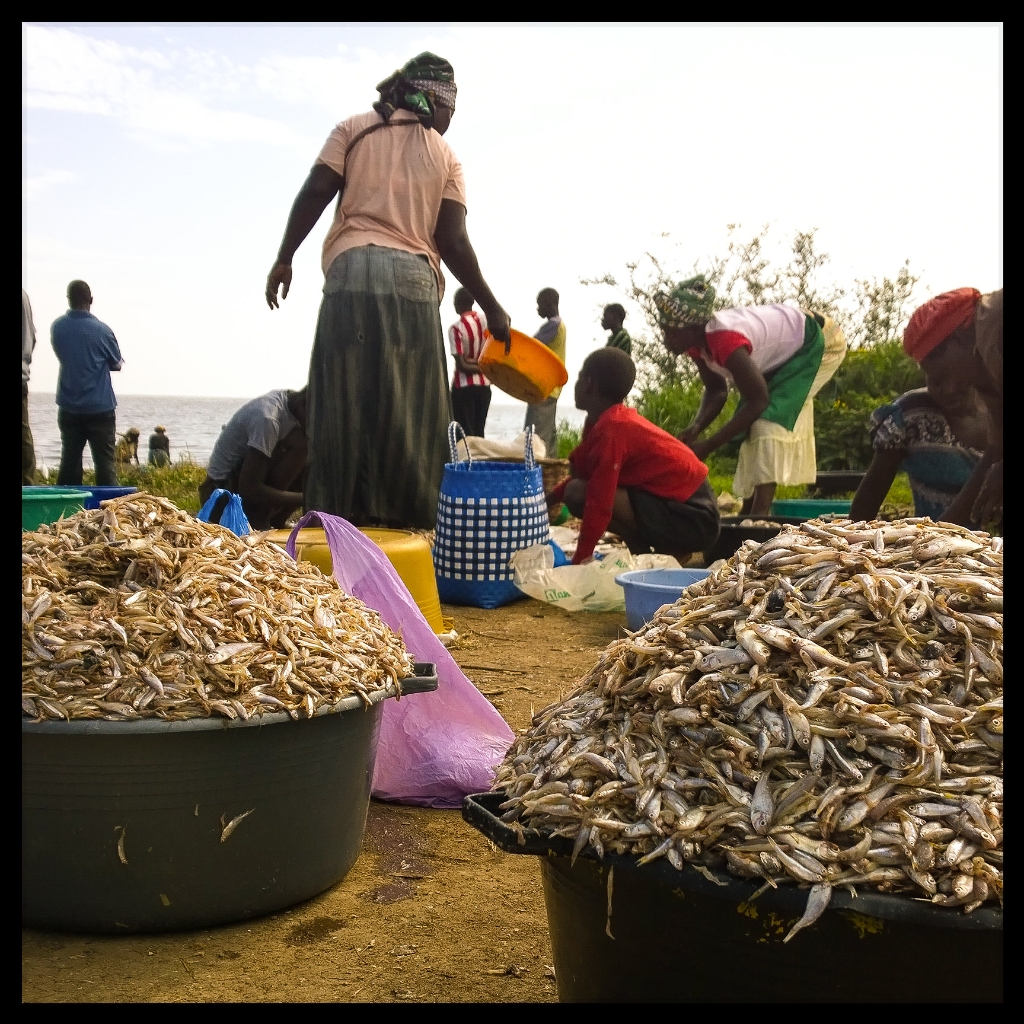
Fish market at Kendu Bay with buckets of Silver Cryprinid(Omena) ready for sale
