= Water supply and sanitation in Kenya =

- The flag of Kenya

Data
- Water coverage (broad definition): (improved water source) 63% (JMP 2015) 37% (WASREB)
- Sanitation coverage (broad definition): (improved sanitation) 30% (JMP 2015) 50% (WASREB)
- Continuity of supply: 18 hours on average
- Average urban water use (L/person/day): not available
- Average urban water and sanitation tariff (US$/m^{3}): 53 (July 2016)
- Share of household metering: 89%
- Annual investment in WSS: KSh.12 billion/= in 2013–14 (US$120 million), corresponding to less than US$3/capita/year
- Share of self-financing by utilities: around 11%
- Share of tax-financing: 58%
- Share of external financing: 31%

Institutions
- Decentralization to municipalities: yes, since 2003
- Water and sanitation regulator: Water Services Regulatory Commission
- Responsibility for policy setting: Ministry of Water and Irrigation (water supply), Ministry of Public Health and Sanitation (sanitation)
- Sector law: 2014 Water Bill No.14
- No. of urban service providers: 91 (2015)

Water supply and sanitation in Kenya is characterised by low levels of access to water and sanitation, in particular in urban slums and in rural areas, as well as poor service quality in the form of intermittent water supply. Seasonal and regional water scarcity in Kenya exacerbates the difficulty to improve water supply.

The Kenyan water sector underwent far-reaching reforms through the Water Act No. 8 of 2002. Previously service provision had been the responsibility of a single National Water Conservation and Pipeline Corporation as well as of a few local utilities established since 1996. After the passage of the act service provision was gradually decentralised to 91 local Water Service Providers (WSPs). These were linked to 8 regional Water Services Boards (WSBs) in charge of asset management through Service Provision Agreements (SPAs) with the WSPs. The Act also created a national regulatory board that carries out performance benchmarking and is in charge of approving SPAs and tariff adjustments. With the Water Bill, 2014, the functions of the 8 WSBs were transferred to 47 Water Works Development Boards in each county of Kenya.

The Ministry of Water and Irrigation remains in charge of policies for water supply, while the Ministry of Public Health and Sanitation is in charge of policies for sanitation.

Although urban water tariffs are high by regional standards (KSh.60/= or US$0.60 per m3 on average in 2014), these tariffs only allow the recovery of operating costs, but not the recovery of capital costs. Full cost recovery is not achieved due to various reasons, including a high level of non-revenue water (average of 42%). Based on the unit cost of production, the nationwide losses due to non-revenue water in 2014 were estimated at KSh.5.2 billion/=, equivalent to US$52 million. Another reason is the need to tap distant water sources at a high cost in some locations. For example, Mombasa is supplied from a source located 220 km from the city. Although 16% of Kenyans in urban areas have access to sewerage, there is no sewerage levy in Kenya, making this expensive service essentially free of charge.

== Data sources and interpretation ==
Collecting reliable data on the Kenyan water and sanitation sector is difficult because reporting is often incomplete and different definitions are being used. Two sources of nationwide representative information are censuses carried out every ten years, with the next one scheduled for 2029, and Demographic and Health Surveys carried out every five years by the Kenya National Bureau of Statistics. The data thus collected are analysed by the Joint Monitoring Programme for Water Supply and Sanitation of WHO and UNICEF to assess progress towards achievement of the Sustainable Development Goals. These data only assess the availability of water and sanitation infrastructure. They do not assess whether water is safe to drink, sufficient in quantity, continuously available or affordable.

Another important source of information is the annual "impact report" published by the water regulatory agency WASREB since 2008. Through this report much more detailed information is publicly available today on many water service providers than in the past and than in many other countries. However, data in the report refer only to the population served by Water Service Providers, which is not the entire population of Kenya, omitting particularly parts of rural areas.

== Water resources ==
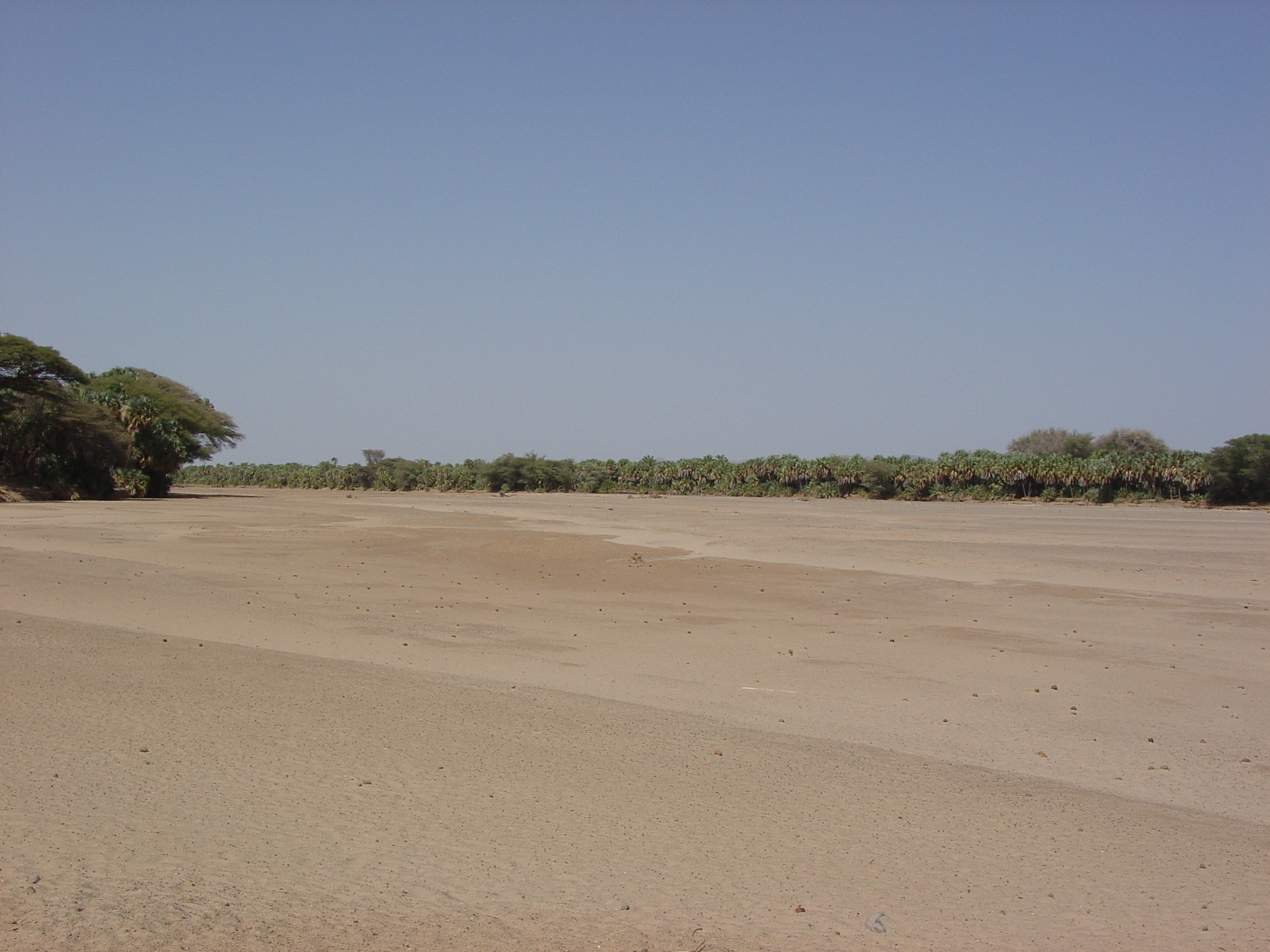
The Kerio River in the Rift Valley during the dry season.

The renewable freshwater resources of Kenya are estimated at 20.2 km^{3} per year, which corresponds to 647 m^{3} per capita per year. The total yearly water withdrawal is estimated to be over 2.7 km^{3}, or less than 14% of resources. However, water resources availability varies significantly in time and between regions. Most parts of the country have two rainy seasons. The long rains are typically from March to May while short rains are typically from October to November.

In addition, Kenya experiences every three to four years droughts and floods, which affect a large number of the population. The latest severe drought was from 2007 to the end of 2009, which had impacts on all sectors of the economy. The average annual rainfall is 630 mm, but it varies between less than 200 mm in northern Kenya to over 1,800 mm on the slopes of Mount Kenya.

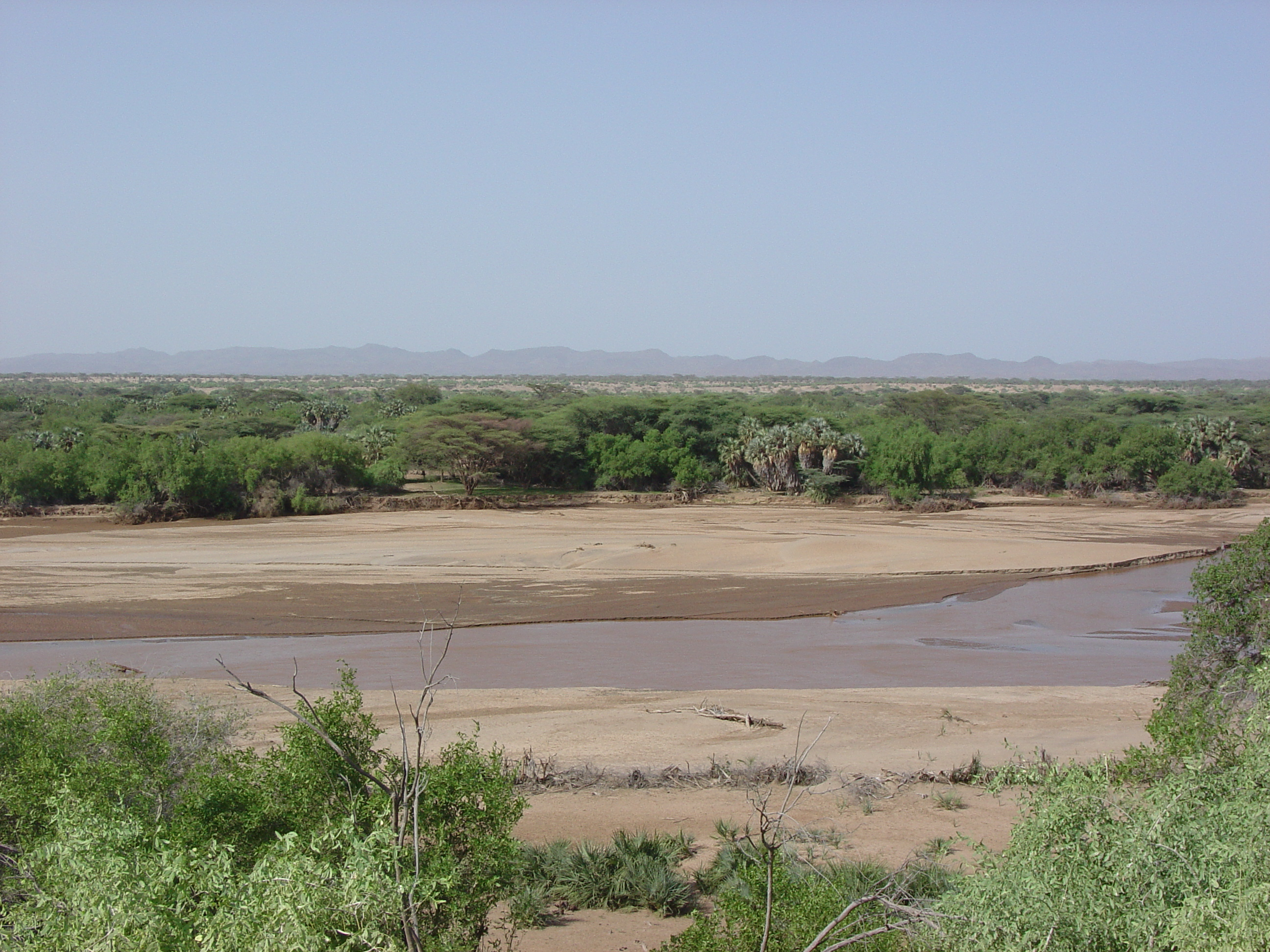
The Kerio River flowing after heavy spring rainstorms in the area, illustrating the stark difference in water availability between the dry and wet season.

=== Surface water ===
Kenya is divided into five drainage basins. The Lake Victoria Basin Drainage area system in Western Kenya is part of the Nile River Basin. The closed Rift Valley Inland Drainage system includes a number of rivers and lakes, including large freshwater lakes such as Lake Turkana, Lake Baringo and Lake Naivasha, rivers such as the Kerio River, as well as a number of salt lakes.

The Athi Drainage system, the Tana Drainage system and the Ewaso Ng'iro North Drainage system all flow towards the Indian Ocean. The water distribution in the basins is highly uneven with the highest water availability in the Lake Victoria Basin (more than 50%) and the lowest in the Athi Drainage system. Only the Tana and Lake Victoria Basins, have surplus water resources while the three other basins face deficits.

The capital city Nairobi receives its water resources from two drainage systems: The oldest sources, the Kikuyu Springs (used since 1906) and the Ruiru Dam (since 1938) are located in the Athi River Basin. The Sasumua Dam, the Ndakaini-Thika Dam (since 1996) and Chania-B Dam supply Nairobi through interbasin transfer from the Tana River drainage area. About 20% of the supply is from ground water resources which corresponds to around 60,000 to 70,000 m^{3} per day. Mombasa, Kenya's second largest city, serves its water demand through the Marere Water Works in the south-west, the Baricho Intake at the lower Athi River and from Mzima Springs, upper Athi River, through a 220 km pipeline to the city.

=== Groundwater ===
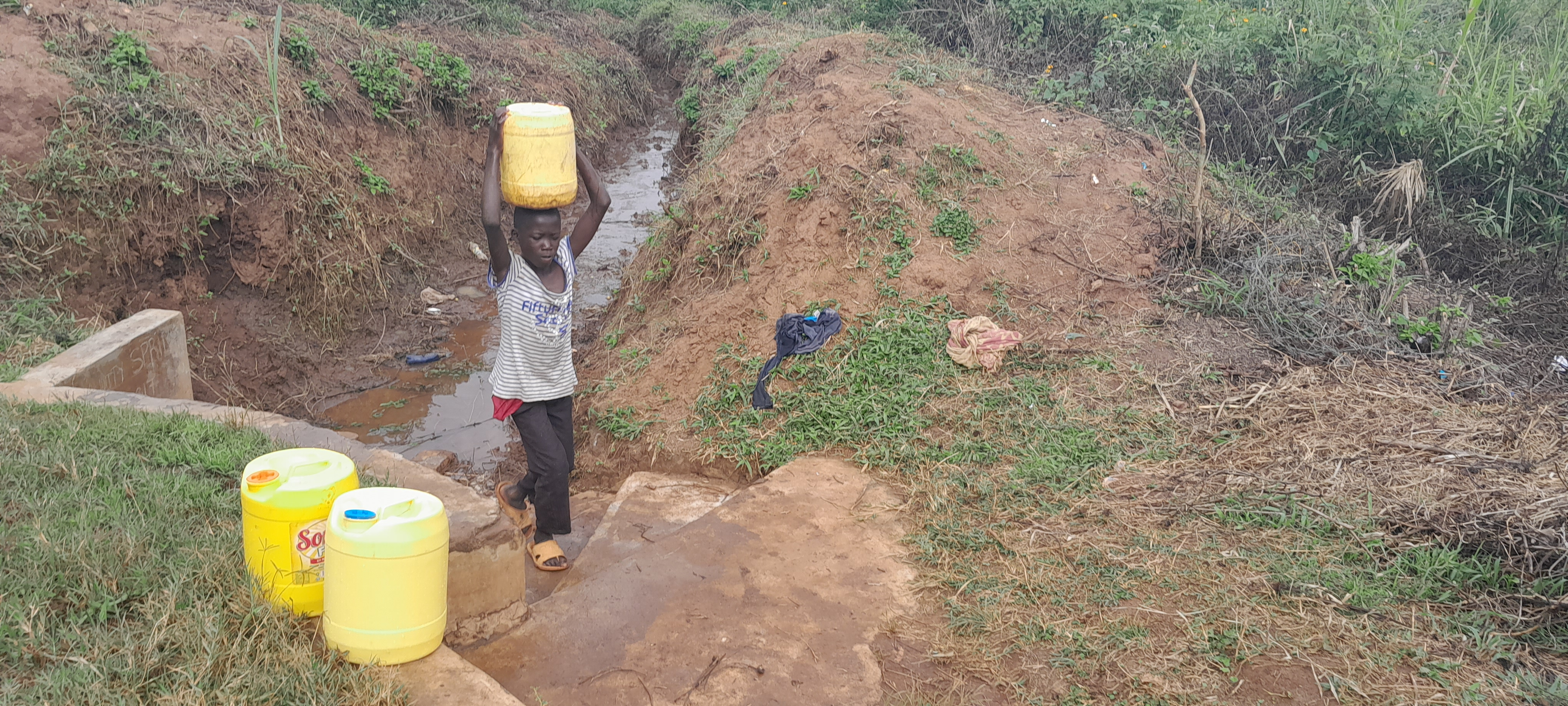
Kid fetching water from ground water spring in Western Kenya

Kenya relies on both surface water resources, from rivers, lakes and dammed reservoirs; and on groundwater. Dependence on groundwater is highest in rural areas and in the coastal zone, where urban areas also rely on groundwater.

Groundwater exploitation has considerable potential for boosting water supplies in Kenya but its use is limited by poor water quality, overexploitation, saline intrusion along the coastal areas, and inadequate knowledge of the occurrence of the resource. On-going maintenance of groundwater infrastructure, particularly in rural areas, is another challenge: fixing broken handpumps is often seen as something that rural communities must manage themselves. Kenya is one of several countries where a professionalized maintenance service model is being developed as an alternative approach to improving the sustainability of water supply systems.

Due to unavailability of surface water sources in dryland areas, groundwater is a major resource for water supply in most of the country. Important aquifers exist in volcanic terrain and associated quaternary sediments, and in sedimentary terrain underlain by metamorphic rocks in northern and coastal Kenya. About 57.21 million cubic metres of groundwater was abstracted in Kenya in 2012.

== Access ==
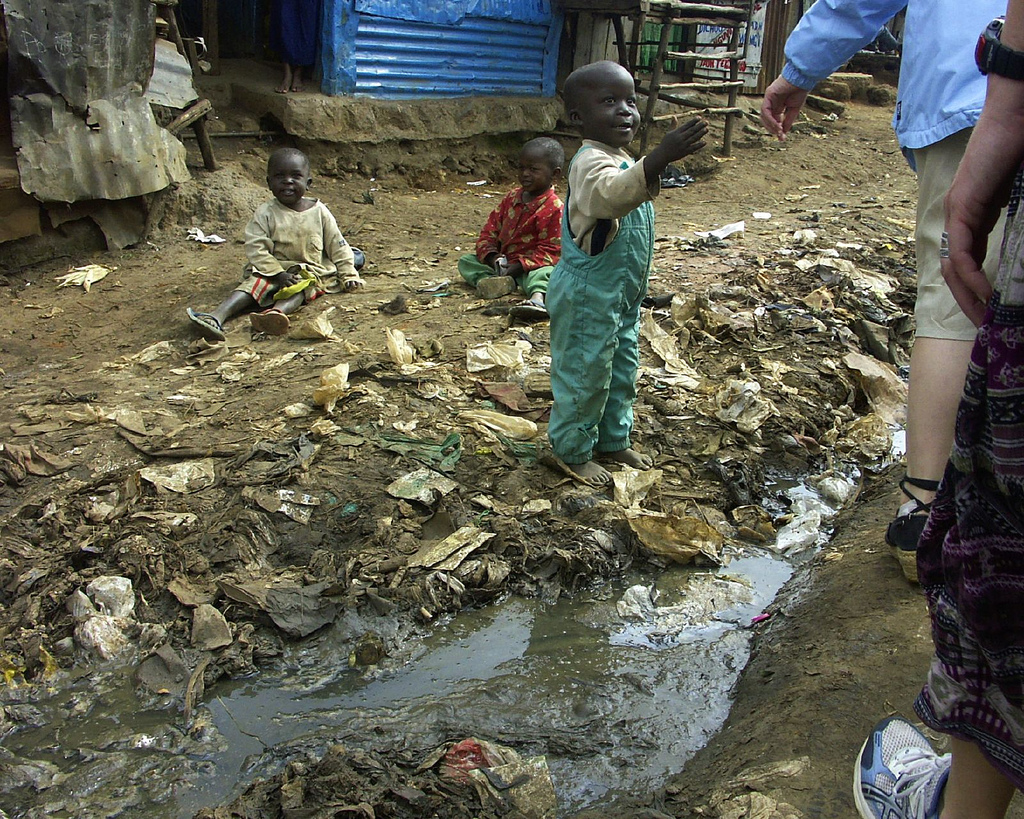
Kibera, Nairobi, an example of lack of access to basic sanitation.

=== Water supply ===
Estimates from the Joint Monitoring Programme for Water Supply and Sanitation (JMP) show that 58% of Kenyans (83% in urban areas and 50% in rural areas) had access to at least basic drinking water sources in 2015. 22% of Kenyans (45% in urban areas and 14% in rural areas) are reported as having access to piped water through a house or yard connection. According to the JMP estimates, access to improved water sources in urban areas decreased from 92% in 1990 to 82% in 2015. In rural areas, however, access increased from 33% to 57% during the same period.

The total number of people lacking access to "at least basic" clean water in 2015 was 19 million people.

According to the 2016-17 WASREB report 55% of the total population had "access to water". Previously, according to the definition called "weighted access" (see above), the 2009 Impact Report had estimated that in 2006–2007 only 37% of Kenyans had access to sufficient and safe drinking water close to their homes at an affordable price. Significant regional differences in access were reported: the highest level was registered in the area served by Tetu Aberdare Water and Sanitation Company (72%) whereas the lowest was recorded in Muthambi in Meru South District (4%). In the capital Nairobi access for the same period was reported at 35%, as opposed to a less realistic figure of 46% reported for 2005–2006.

==== Water sources ====
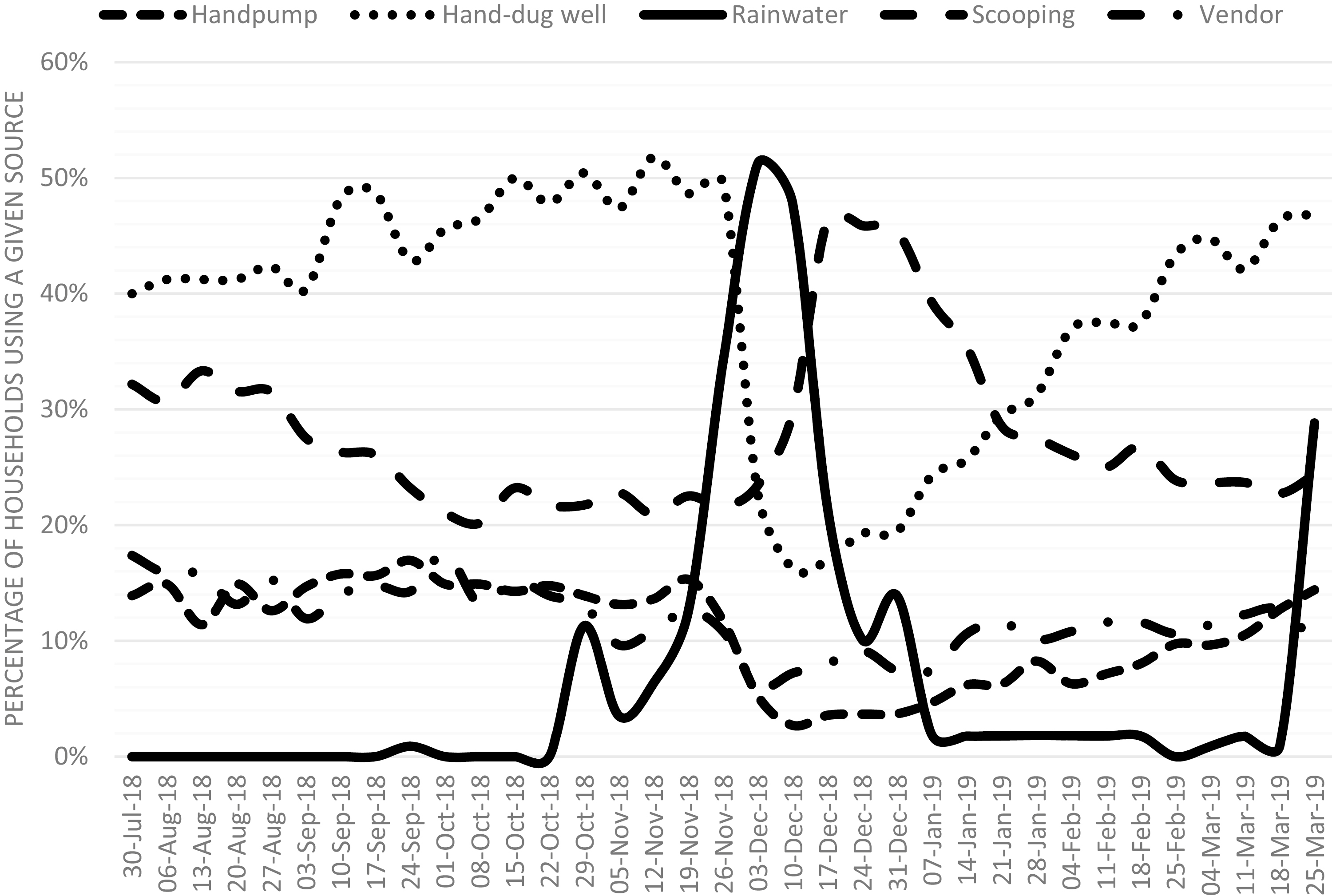
The fallacy of a singular, rural drinking water source: Instead, there are several water source that households in rural Kenya choose from.

The poor, in particular women and girls, spend a significant amount of time fetching water in both rural and urban areas. For example, the 2007 Citizen Report Card survey showed that users of water kiosks in cities fetch water 4–6 times per day. In Kisumu, this meant that a poor household spent 112 minutes per day to fetch water at normal times, and as much as 200 minutes per day during times of scarcity.

Water diaries have been used to document the sources, uses and costs of water at the household level in rural Kenya. People in rural areas use a wide range of water sources, some of which they have to pay for, and some of which are free of charge: Rainwater (rock catchment or roof catchment), hand-dug wells or handpumps (these can be household-owned, private, inside or outside of the village), water kiosk (inside or outside of the village), or vendors who use donkeys and carts or motorized vehicles. Further options include dry riverbed scooping, earth pans, rivers or canals, and piped water inside the dwelling or yard. The water uses of these households are for drinking, cooking, laundry, dish washing, washing/bathing, livestock or small-scale irrigation.

Rural schools in Kenya often use two or three different water sources, and these can be classified into on-site sources (either piped water supply or rainwater harvesting), or off-site sources ("unimproved", supplied by water vendors, or "basic"). About 80% of schools in Kenya (four in five schools) have their own rainwater harvesting system. However, in the drier months of June to October, water is often purchased from water vendors.

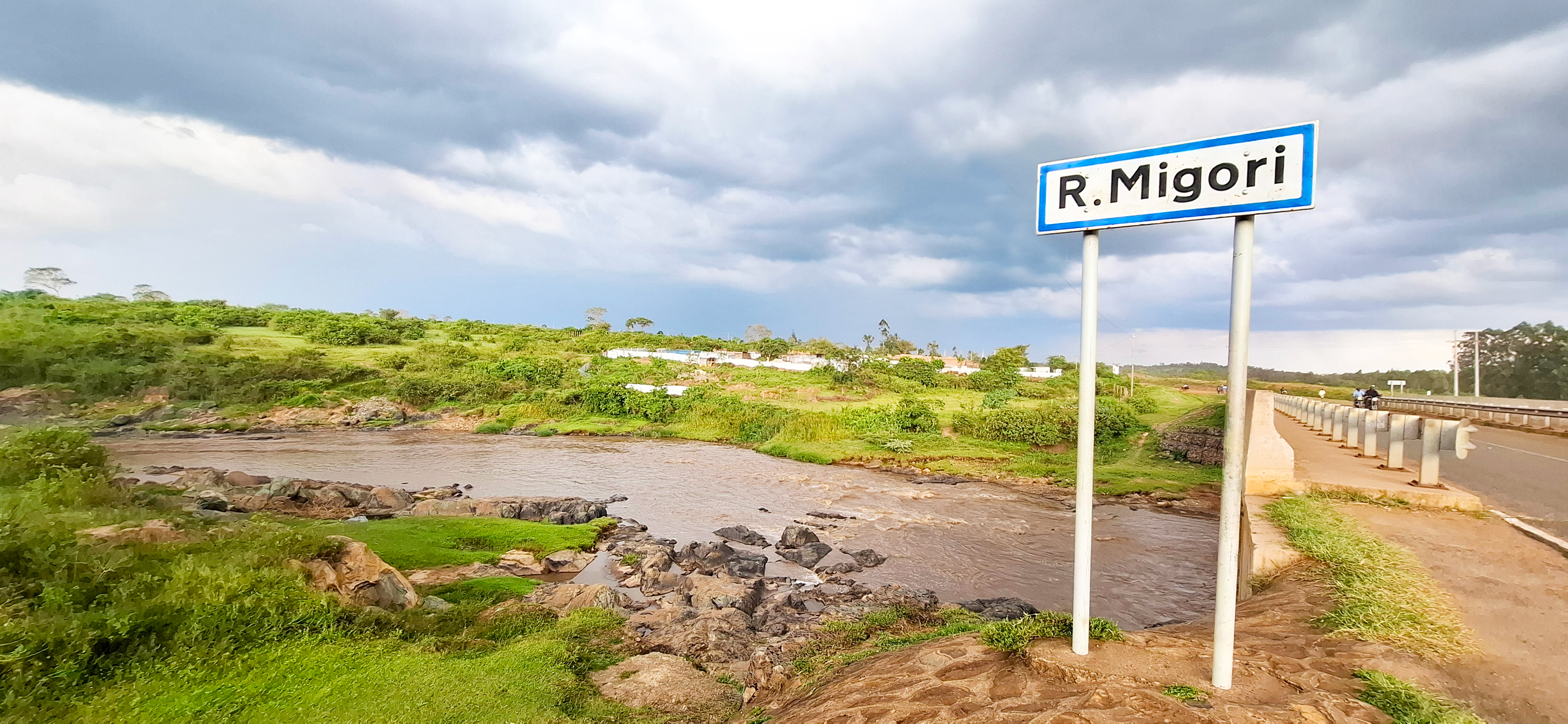
River Migori-Kehancha, Kuria

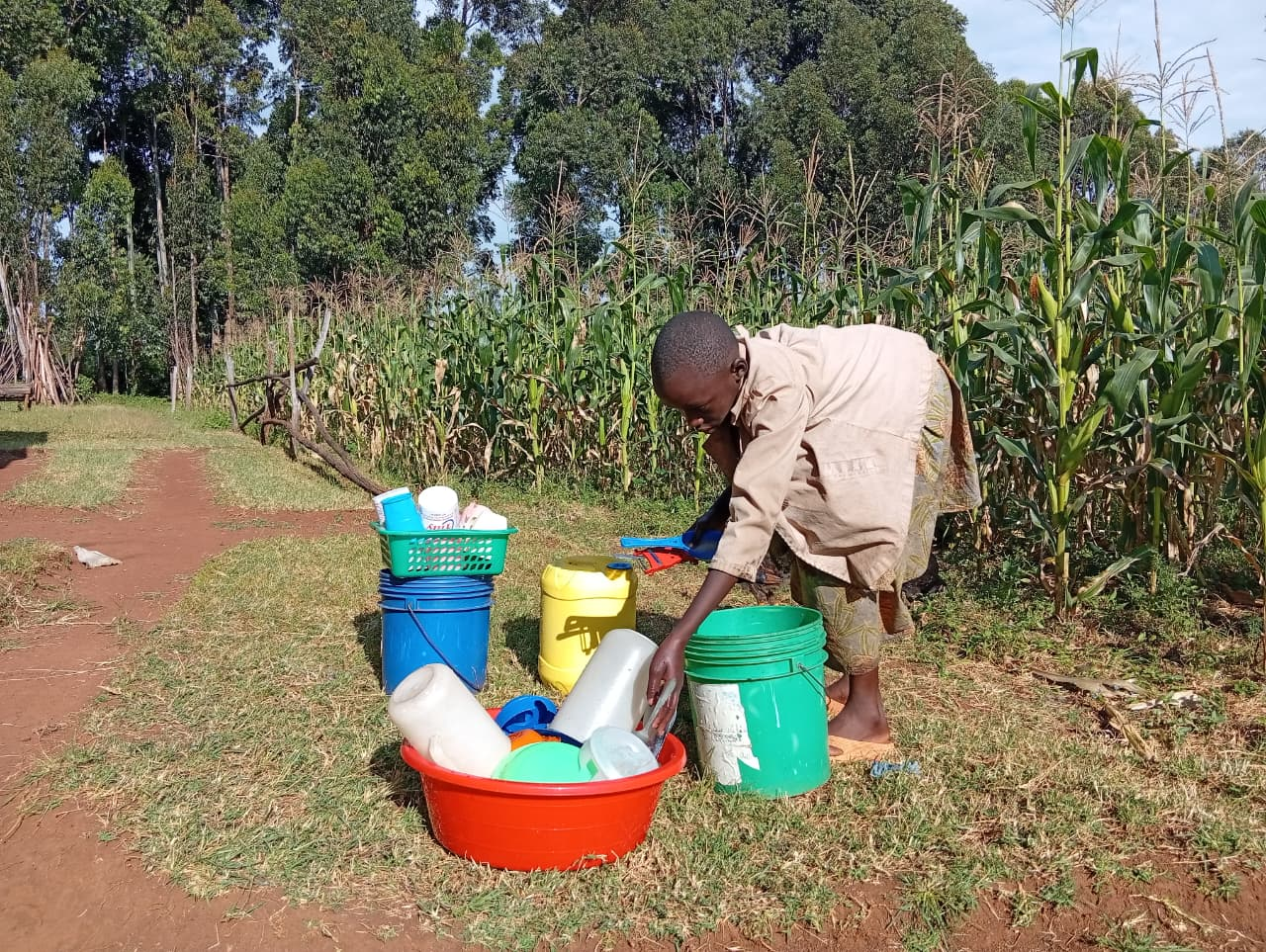
Girl Washing utencils-Kuria

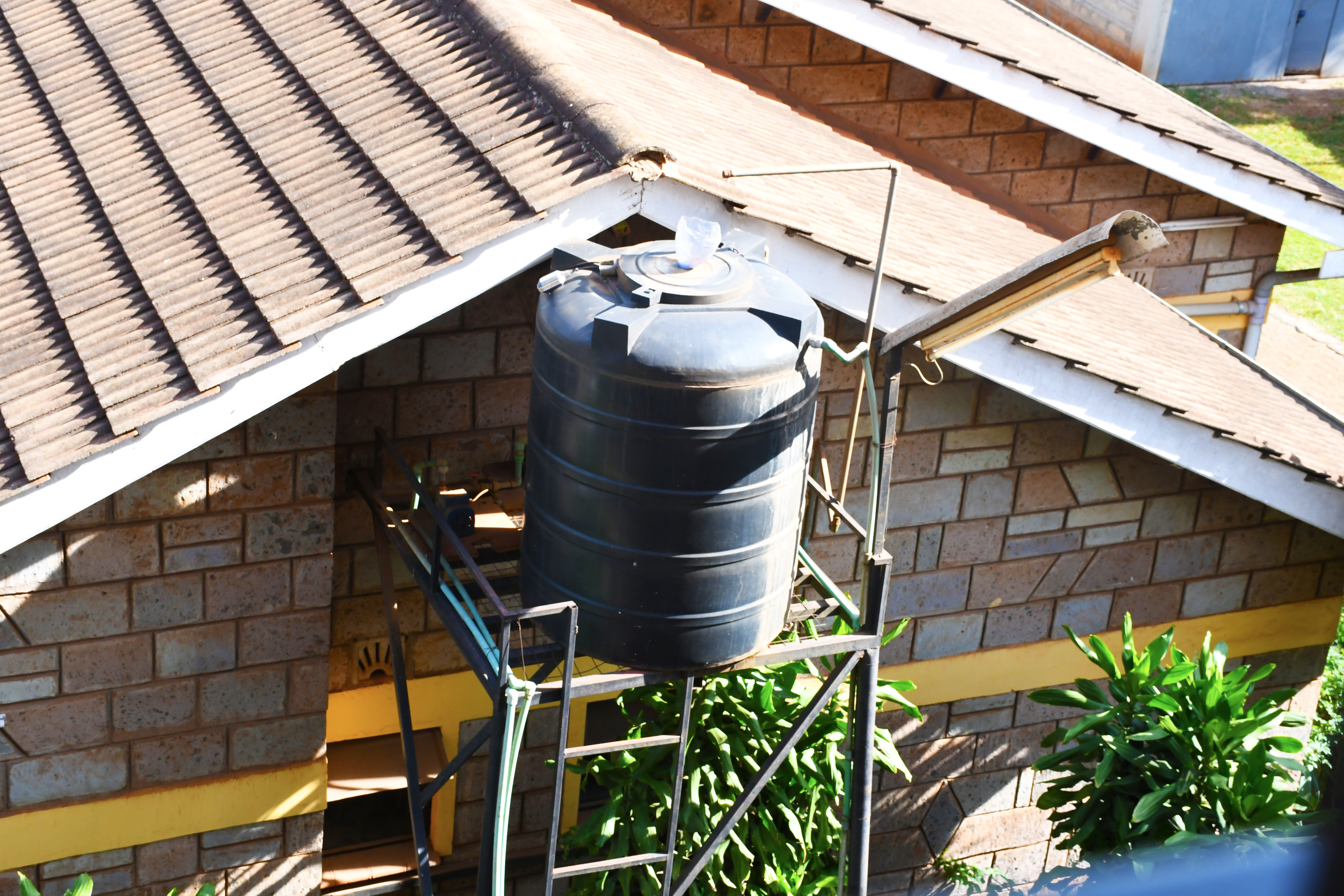
Rain Water Harvesting-Gachie, Kenya

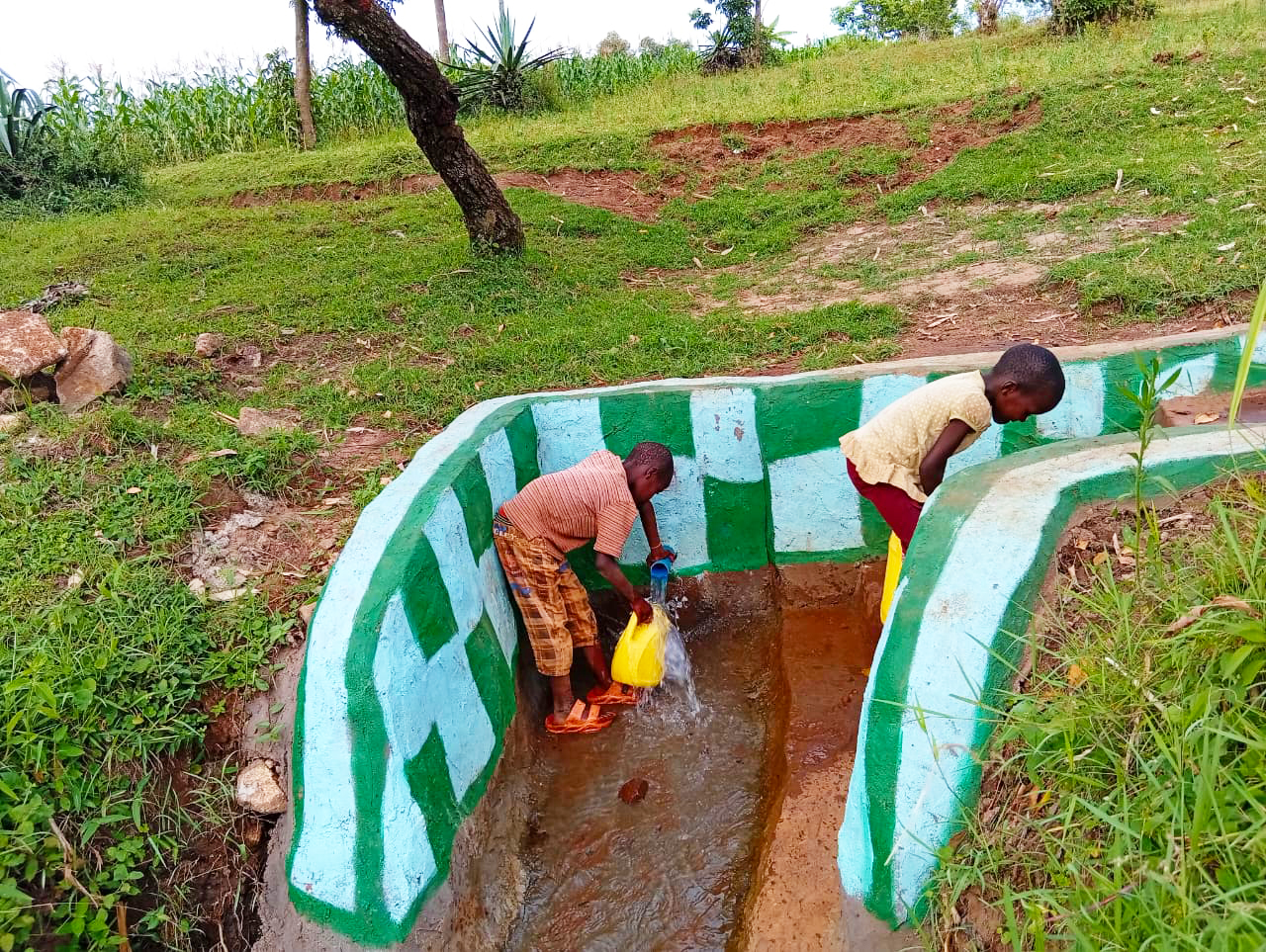
Children fetching Water in a River-Kuria

=== Sanitation ===
The total number of people lacking access to at least basic sanitation in 2015 was 32 million people.

Countrywide estimates for 2015 by the JMP indicate that 30% (43% of urban and 28% of rural) Kenyans had access to at least basic sanitation, including sewerage. In urban areas an additional 27% of the population used shared latrines. In rural areas, open defecation was estimated to be still practiced by 12% of the population. The 2015 report by the Water and Sanitation Regulatory Board did not include any figures on access to sanitation in the broad sense, but only an estimate of access to sewerage in urban areas, which was estimated at 16%.

In 2006–2007 it had been reported that half of the Kenyan population within the service area of 55 WSPs had access to improved sanitation facilities (this definition includes flush, pour flush toilets connected to a piped system, septic tanks, VIP latrines and pit latrines). In Nairobi, sanitation coverage was about 23% in 2006–2007. The Kenyan Integrated Household Budget Survey of 2006 reported a much higher sanitation coverage 84%, including shared latrines and shallow pit latrines.

== Service quality ==
The quality of service of WSPs is closely monitored by the Water Services Regulatory Board (WASREB) with the aim of promoting comparative competition and performance improvements. Some of the most important indicators of service quality are water quality, continuity of water supply and wastewater treatment.

=== Water quality ===
In 2015 WASREB reported that 23 utilities provided good quality water (defined as more than 95% compliance with standards), 15 acceptable quality and for 53 utilities water quality was not acceptable (defined as less than 90% compliance). The two parameters measured were residual chlorine (40% weight) and compliance with bacteriological standards (60% weight). If the number of samples taken was lower than foreseen in the standard, the compliance was rated lower. The highest compliance was achieved in Kericho and Kisumu with 100% each. A citizens' report carried out in Nairobi, Mombasa and Kisumu in 2007 provided information about customers' perception of water quality: around 70% of households using water from connections to the mains said they found the taste and smell of water acceptable, and that the water was clear. Even so, the vast majority of respondents treat water prior to consumption, which shows continuing uncertainty about its quality.

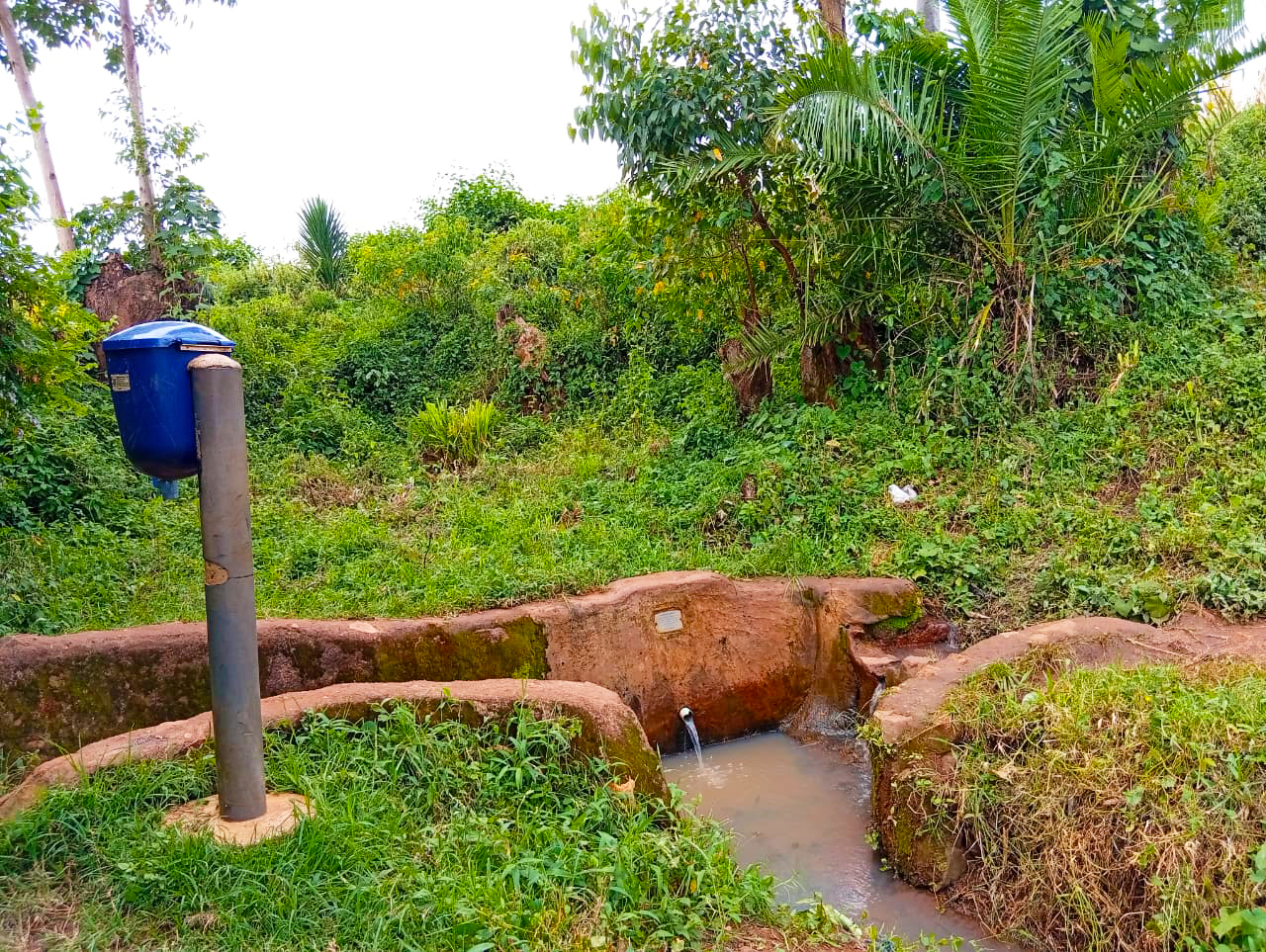
blue can with chlorine dispenser next to a water point in Kegonche village- Kuria

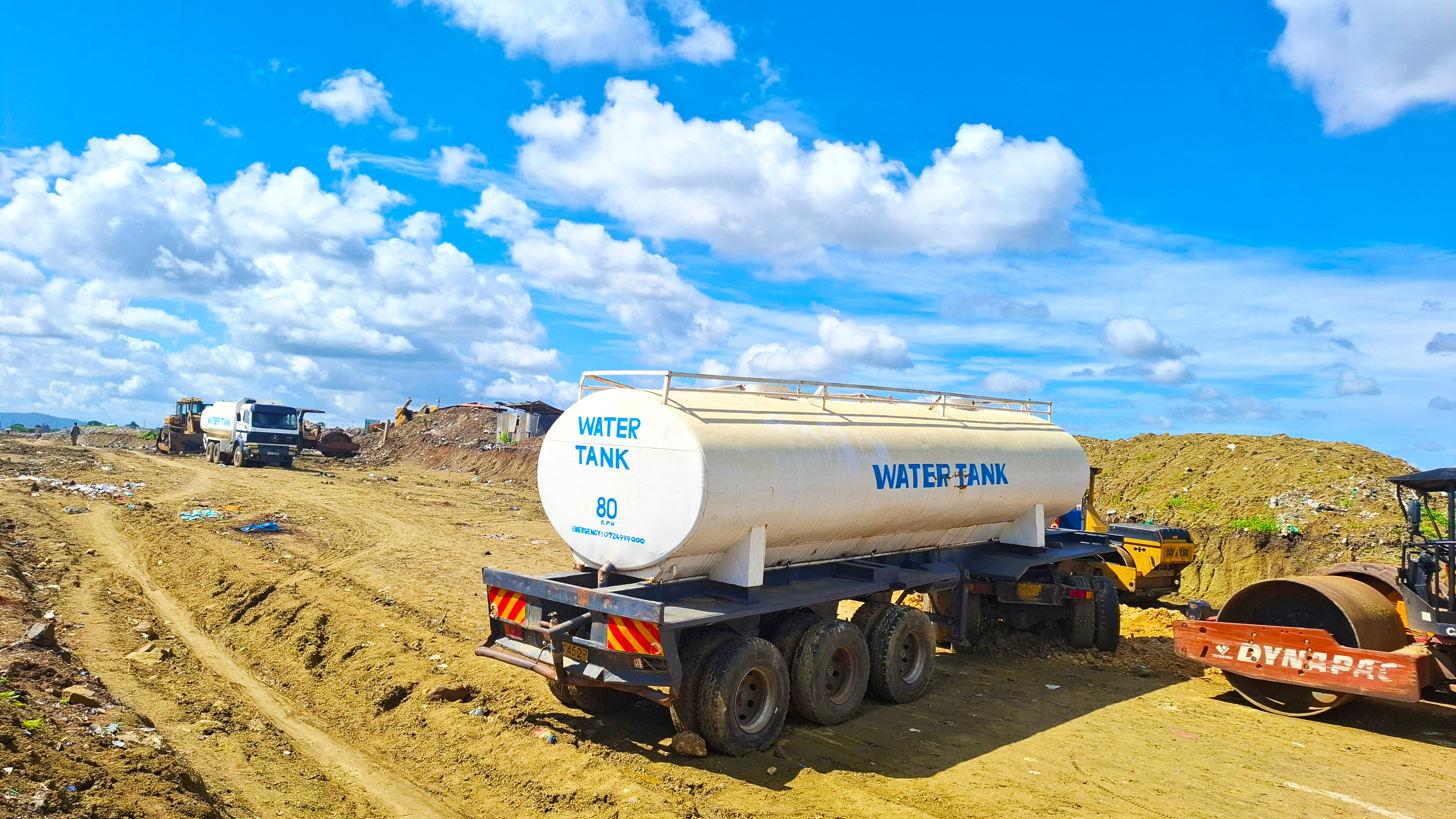
Water tanks - Mwakiringo dumpsite in Mombasa County

In regions where drinking water is sourced from groundwater, attention needs to be paid to water chemistry quality parameters: Groundwater chemistry is an area of concern for water management in Kenya due to geogenic hazards, saline intrusion, and pressures from waste streams and other activities associated with agriculture, industry, and urbanization. Health hazards from groundwater chemistry are wide-spread. For example, in south-eastern Kenya, there are reports of boreholes being abandoned due to salinity and excess iron. Water users in this region associate the saline taste of groundwater with dental fluorosis and gastrointestinal problems.

Chemical contaminants occur widely in groundwaters that are used for drinking but are not regularly monitored. Example priority parameters are fluoride, arsenic, nitrate, or salinity. There is generally not enough data to fully understand distribution of risk. The available data tends to have a bias because research tends to focus on areas of high-profile contamination only. Furthermore, there are only few laboratories available in Kenya that can carry out these chemical analyses.

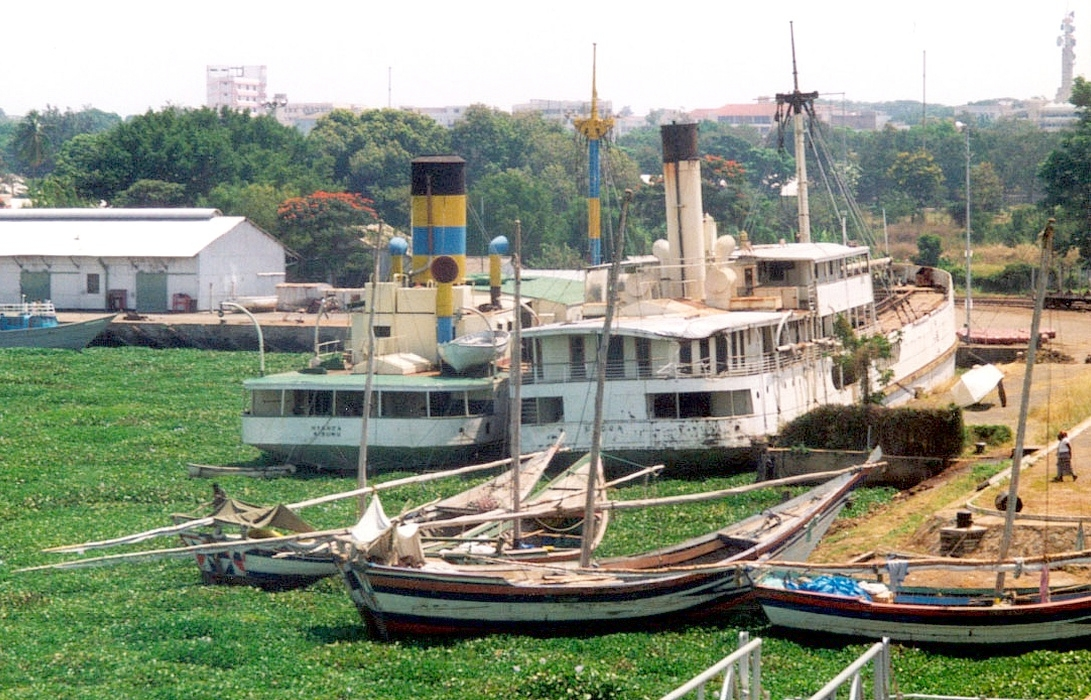
In Kisumu, which receives its water from nearby Lake Victoria, over 40% of citizens report scarcity of drinking water.

=== Continuity of supply ===
The 2015 Impact Report reports an average supply of 18 hours per day, up from 14 hours in 2006–07. Only in nine mostly small WSPs water is provided continuously 24 hours per day. In Nairobi water is provided on average for 18 hours a day and in Mombasa for 6 hours. Nonetheless, instances of water scarcity (defined as more than five days without or with insufficient water supply) still occur in Kenya. In 2006 in Kisumu over 40% of households (both poor and non-poor) connected to water mains reported scarcity. The greatest difference between the poor and non-poor was recorded in Nairobi, where poor households were more than twice as likely to say they experienced scarcity. A higher percentage of kiosk users reported scarcity than households with mains connections, suggesting that in times of scarcity kiosks are less likely to receive water than domestic connections.

=== Wastewater treatment ===
According to an assessment report carried out in 2009, there are 43 sewerage systems in Kenya and waste water treatment plants in 15 towns (total population served: 900,000 inhabitants). The operation capacity of these wastewater treatment plants is estimated at 16% of design capacity. The main reasons for this inefficiency are inadequate operation and maintenance and low connection rate to sewers. In Kenya, the estimated connection rate is 19% (12% according to another report).

Of the wastewater that enters the sewer network, only about 60% reaches the treatment plants. The most common solution used for wastewater treatment in Kenya are waste stabilisation ponds. One of them is the Dandora Waste Stabilisation Pond System which treats the industrial and domestic sewage from the city of Nairobi and is the largest pond system in Africa. Mixing industrial effluent and domestic sewage in mixed sewer system, however, often causes poor performance in Kenyan pond treatment systems.

The Citizen Report Card moreover indicates that septic tanks are often used for the disposal of wastewater from flush toilets in Mombasa. Pit latrine users from Nairobi, Kisumu and Mombasa indicated that some wastewater empties into storm sewers, soak-aways and cess pits designed for kitchen waste, thus causing environmental pollution. In 2001 a pollution incident occurred in the town of Embu. Raw sewage was discharged from sewage treatment works into a nearby river and caused the death of 28 people who used the water downstream for domestic purposes.

== History and recent developments ==
The history of the water and sanitation sector in Kenya is characterised by institutional fragmentation that led to numerous inefficiencies and by subsequent attempts at reform.

=== Beginnings ===
The history of piped water supply in Kenya can be traced back to the period of the East African Protectorate. At that time water supply was focused on the needs of colonial settlements. The administration of water supply was carried out by the Hydraulic Branch of the Public Works Department, which started operating in the coastal city of Mombasa. The construction of the Uganda Railway in 1896 provided an important impetus for the development of water pipelines in the interior of the country along the railway line.

=== Colonial period ===
Between 1920 and independence in 1963 the first attempts were made at regulating water supply in the colony and protectorate of Kenya, while responsibility was shared by many institutions. In the 1950s and early 60s, responsibility for the administration of water supply was split between three institutions: the Ministry of Works operating in urban centres with centralised water service provision; Local Authorities that were deemed capable of managing water supply; and the Water Development Department, which was responsible for developing new water supplies for urban and rural centres. Bulk water to Mombasa was provided by the Mombasa Pipeline Work, while day-to-day operations of water pipelines were carried out by the water department. There was no single framework for the administration and management of water. In 1952 the Water Act Cap 372 was enacted, which remained the legal basis for the water sector until 2002.

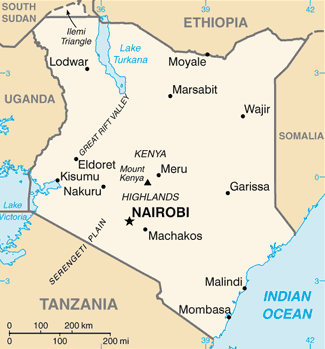
A map of Kenya.

In the sanitation subsector there was no functioning institutional framework either. Officially, the 1921 Public Health Ordinance gave the Ministry of Health the role of administering sanitation, but it was rarely enforced. The local population, moreover, was reluctant to adopt sanitary measures imposed by the colonial government. Between 1929 and 1939 intense public health education campaigns were carried out which led to the diffusion of pit latrines.

By 1954 different types of sanitation were in use in different parts of Kenya: pit latrines were in use in most native reserves, bucket type latrines prevailed in towns while waterborne sanitation was used in the European quarters of major towns. During the Mau Mau uprising Africans were concentrated in detention camps and local markets were kept closed out of fear of rebellion. This led to the neglect of adequate sanitation and in the proliferation of communal latrines.

=== Independent Kenya (1963–1980) ===
As Kenya gained independence in 1963, attempts at simplifying the administration of water supply resulted in the transferral of all organisations responsible for water to the Ministry of Agriculture in 1964. The distribution of responsibilities and authority was, however, unclear and led to bottlenecks and inefficiencies. In 1965 the government led by Jomo Kenyatta stated in the Sessional Paper No. 10 on African Socialism and its Application to Planning in Kenya that government policy had to be directed towards the eradication of poverty, illiteracy and disease.

This initiated a period of active involvement in water policy by the government, based on the principle that water is a social good to be either provided free of charge or subsidised. As a result, water tariffs between 1970 and 1981 were heavily subsidised and in contradiction with the principle of operating cost recovery. Throughout the 1960s, the Environmental Sanitation Programme supported by WHO-UNICEF was carried out in Kenya with the aims of developing water supplies for small rural communities, improving waste disposal methods and providing sanitary education for the rural population.

The rural water supply schemes set up as part of the programme were operated by County Councils (under the Ministry of Local Government). In 1972 about 560 rural water supply schemes were running in Kenya and provided water to a population of about 664,000, UNICEF reported. Local communities also started developing their own water supplies and set up water committees: they received training about design systems, hydraulic calculations, costs and submission methods. A follow-up study by UNICEF carried out in 1974 showed the many problems that affected these projects.

In 1970 the Government of Kenya signed a credit agreement with Sweden to finance Rural Water Supply Development. The WHO was to provide a study of the water situation in the country. The study, completed in 1973, showed that in Kenya there was a major lack in senior and technical staff; while donors could provide most development funds, current expenditure could not be covered by local funds and the Government lacked a long-term plan of water supply development. In response, a fully fledged Ministry of Water Resources Management and Development was created in 1974. The ministry took over government operated water schemes as well as those operated by county councils. In the same year the National Water Master Plan Initiative was launched. Its primary aim was to develop new water supply schemes and secure access to potable water within reasonable distance to all Kenyans. The initiative bore the slogan, "Water for all by the year 2000".

=== Transition period (1980–1992) ===
In the 1980s, the government began experiencing budget constraints which put a strain on the ambitious projects of providing universal access to safe water and expanding the water and sewerage systems. Priority was given to the rehabilitation of existing schemes and the construction of large-scale water projects such as the Baricho and Kilimanjaro water schemes. In 1980 a National Sanitation Council was established to sensitise the population about the health benefits of sanitation and to advise and guide local authorities on the matter. The council slowly faded without accomplishing its mandate.

In 1983 a Water Use Study carried out by SIDA confirmed that the situation was unsustainable and suggested decentralisation and removing operation and maintenance responsibilities from the Ministry. To improve performance and efficiency and to reduce the financial burden of the water sector, in June 1988 the National Water Conservation and Pipeline Corporation (NWCPC) was established. Its role was to operate water supply systems under state control on a commercial basis.

=== Commercialization of local utilities ===
But the centralised approach failed to achieve improvements. Thus the idea of creating local-government owned commercial utilities emerged. A Second National Water Master Plan was formulated in 1992, and a new policy approach emphasising decentralisation and a demand-driven approach was discussed at the national level. The city of Eldoret went ahead in 1994 and set up a water and sewer department with finances that were separate from the municipal budget. The utility's board includes representatives of NGOs, women's organisations, the chamber of commerce and industry and the Kenya Consumer Organization. The commercialisation of the utility in Eldoret as well as in Nyeri and Kericho was supported by the German development co-operation.

The approach was formalised by the Ministry of Local Government, through the Companies Act Cap. 486 of 1996 which allowed the establishment of publicly owned, commercially run water and sanitation companies. As of 2002, this approach had led to significant improvements in terms of reduced of non-revenue water, improved bill collection and fewer complaints in Nyeri and Eldoret. However, other local water companies in Kitale and Nakuru had to be taken over again by the national government due to financial problems.

In 1999, the first National Policy of Water Resources Management and Development was published. The policy stated that the government would hand over urban water systems to autonomous departments within local authorities, and rural water supply to communities. Another provision of this document was placing water and sanitation services under single utilities. While developing the National Water Policy, the Government also established a National Task Force to review the Water Act, Cap 372, and draft amendments that would result in a complete overhaul of the sector.

=== Reorganisation of water institutions (2002–2011) ===
The current legal framework for the Kenyan water and sanitation sector is based on the Water Act No. 8 of 2002 which became effective in March 2003. The 2002 Water Act introduced far-reaching reforms based on the following principles:

- the separation of the management of water resources from the provision of water services;
- the separation of policy making from day-to-day administration and regulation;
- decentralisation of functions to lower level state organs;
- the involvement of non-government entities in the management of water resources and in the provision of water services.

The implementation of these principles triggered a wide-ranging restructuring of the sector and led to the creation of new institutions. The Water Sector Reform Secretariat (WSRS) was formed as a transitional unit in the Ministry of Water and Irrigation to oversee the formation of the new water sector institutions. In 2004, the Water Services Trust Fund (WSTF) was established to provide financial assistance towards capital investment costs in areas lacking adequate services (usually inhabited by the poor). A Transfer Plan was devised in 2005 (through Legal Notice No. 101 of 12 August 2005) to direct the transfer of staff and assets from the central government to the newly founded Water Services Boards and Water Service Providers (for detailed role descriptions see the next paragraph).

To guide the implementation of the Water Act, a draft National Water Services Strategy (NWSS) for the years 2007–2015 was formulated in June 2007. Its mission is to "realise the goals of the MDG declaration and the Vision 2030 of the Kenyan Government concerning access to safe and affordable water and basic sanitation by responsive institutions within a regime of well-defined standards and regulation." NWSS is based on the identification of sustainable access to safe water and basic sanitation as a human right and an economic good. Among the core commitments are: cost recovery by water service providers to ensure sustainable water and sanitation for all and the formalisation of service provision. In addition, MWI also elaborated pro-poor implementation plans.

In 2010 Kenya adopted a new constitution that enshrines the human right to water and sanitation in Article 43(1). Specifically, it states that every person has the right "to accessible and adequate housing and to reasonable standards of sanitation", as well as the right "to clean and safe water in adequate quantities".

=== Water Bill 2015 and national Water Act 2016 ===
A new water bill was passed in 2015. The bill transforms the eight Water Service Boards (Asset Holding Companies) into 47 Water Works Development Boards in each county of Kenya. This in line with the decentralisation prescribed in the 2010 Constitution of Kenya. Also, the National Water Conservation and Pipeline Corporation became the National Water Storage Authority, the Water Services Regulatory Board became the Water Services Regulatory Commission and the Water Services Trust Fund became the Water Sector Trust Authority. The Bill is meant as an improved version of the Water Act of 2002, rather than another fundamental reform of the sector. The bill – under discussion since 2012 – was finally passed by Parliament as The Water Bill, 2014 (Bill No. 7 of 2014) on 7 July 2015.

The national Water Act 2016 clarifies some aspects of service provision and the structure of the new subnational institutions. However, county budget allocations, especially for the rural water sector and institutions such as schools and clinics remain ambiguous. The Water Act formally recognises the role of both public and private actors in the water sector. It creates a legislated "space" in which professional maintenance service providers can develop.

== Responsibility for water supply and sanitation ==
=== Policy formulation and sector coordination ===
The Ministry of Water and Irrigation (MWI) is the key institution responsible for the water sector in Kenya. The Ministry is divided into five departments: Administration and Support Services, Water Services, Water Resources Management, Irrigation, Drainage and Water Storage, and Land Reclamation. Water supply is overseen by the Department for Water Services, whose functions include: formulation of policy and strategies for water and sewerage services, sector coordination and monitoring of other water services institutions. The Ministry of Water and Irrigation is also in charge of overall sector investments, planning and resource mobilisation.

Sanitation policy is in the hands of the Ministry of Public Health and Sanitation (MoPHS). To harmonise the institutional framework for sanitation MWI and the MoPHS have developed a common Water Supply and Sanitation Concept with clearly defined sanitation targets. As of early 2011, the Minister of Water and Irrigation is Charity Ngilu, chairperson of the National Party of Kenya, which supports Prime Minister Raila Odinga. The Minister of Health and Sanitation is Beth Mugo of the Party of National Unity of President Mwai Kibaki.

Other Ministries also play a role in the water and sanitation sector. The Ministry of Education cooperates with MWI and MoPHS in the area of school sanitation by participating in Water and Sanitation Programme Committees. The Agricultural Sector Coordination Unit deliberates on all issues related to agriculture, including irrigation which is overseen by MWI. The MWI also co-operates with the Ministries of Forestry, of the Environment and of Special Programmes to further the rehabilitation and maintenance of water towers.

=== Regulation ===
Economic regulation. The regulation and monitoring of urban and rural water service provision is carried out by the Water Services Regulatory Board (WASREB). WASREB is a non-commercial state corporation established in March 2003 on the basis of the 2002 Water Act. Its functions comprise: issuing of licenses to water services boards and approval of Service Provision Agreements, developing tariff guidelines and carrying out tariff negotiations, setting standards and developing guidelines for service provision, publishing the results of sector monitoring in the form of comparative reports (such as the Impact Report).

Environmental regulation in Kenya is carried out by the National Environment Management Authority (NEMA). NEMA was established under the Environmental Management and Coordination Act No. 8 of 1999 and became operational in July 2002. Its role is to promote the integration of environmental considerations into government policies, plans, programmes and projects. As regards the water sector in particular, NEMA is in charge of formulating water quality regulations (the current version was elaborated in 2006).

=== Asset management ===
As a result of sector reforms, responsibility for water and sanitation service provision has been devolved to eight regional Water Services Boards (WSBs): Athi (which serves the capital Nairobi), Coast, Tana, Lake Victoria North, Lake Victoria South, Northern, Rift Valley Water Services Board, and since 2008, Tanathi Water Services Board. Water Services Boards are responsible for asset management, that is, for the development and rehabilitation of water and sewerage facilities, for investment planning and implementation.

When the WSBs were established, they were criticised as "an unnecessary layer of bureaucracy" that lead to a "conflation of roles" because they are "both regulators (alongside the WSRB) and market actors" as well as "monoliths... that are far away from the point of service". WSBs operate under licenses, but the licensing regime has been criticised as "bureaucratic, cumbersome and confusing."

=== Service provision ===
Responsibility for water and sanitation service provision is in the hands of Water Services Boards. However, they are not required to provide services directly – they can delegate them to commercially oriented public enterprises, the so-called Water Service Providers (WSPs). Service provision is regulated by service provision agreements (SPAs) to ensure compliance with the standards on quality, service levels and performance established by WASREB. There are two categories of WSPs:

- public utilities – there are 89 WSPs in this category, including both limited liability companies in urban areas owned by one or more local authorities and Water User Associations in rural areas.
- private utilities – there are only two relatively small WSPs in this category, the Runda Water Company and Kiamumbi Water Project.

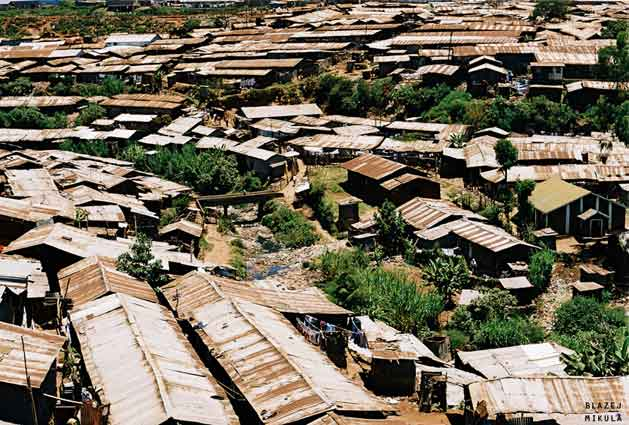
The population of low-income settlements such as Kibera depends on water provided by informal small service providers.

Informal small service providers (SSPs) provide water in both rural and urban low-income settlements. Some of them sell water from tanker trucks or through jerry cans, often at prices that are five to ten times that of piped water supply. Others are self-help groups, often run by women, who provide piped water supply. The Water Services Trust Fund is making efforts to formalise service provision in low-income settlements. It has developed two national concepts for service provision for the poor. The first one is the Community Project Cycle, which makes funds available for local communities that are willing to comply with minimum service standards. The second one, the "Urban Poor Concept" has been implemented in low-income urban areas since 2007 and has led to the construction of numerous water kiosks that meet sustainability standards.

An example of a partnership between a utility and self-help groups can be found in Nyalenda, a poor neighbourhood with about 60,000 inhabitants in Kisumu. The local utility sells water in bulk to self-help groups that in turn manage networks and water kiosks inside their neighbourhoods.

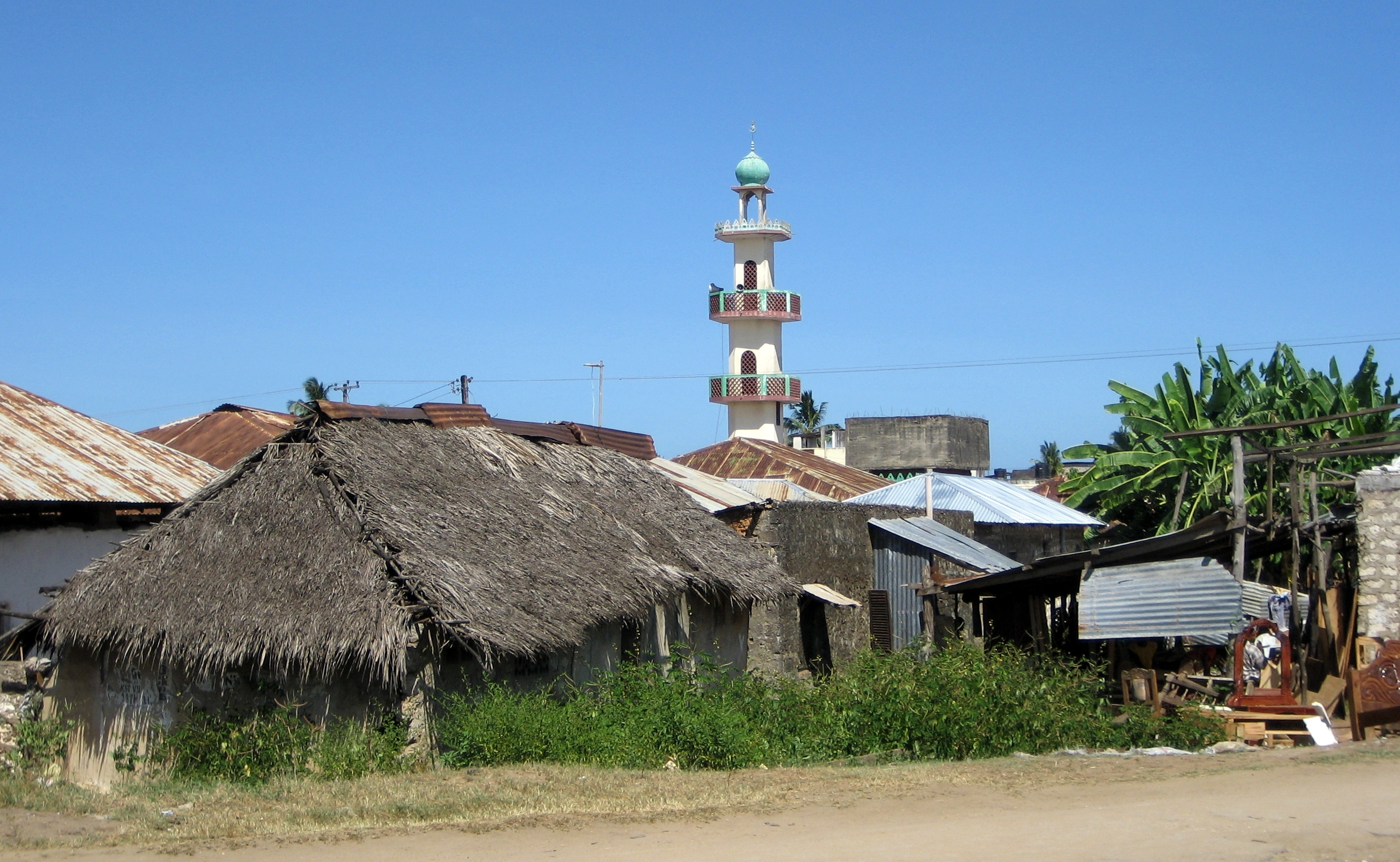
A view of the old town of Malindi, a touristic city where a private company ran the water system from 1999 to 2003.

Private sector participation. The private sector plays a limited, but not negligible role in operating water supply systems in Kenya. Since 1975 Runda Water Limited provides piped water to the Executive Residential Housing Estate of Old Runda in Nairobi. In 2008, Runda signed a service provision agreement with the Athi WSB for the provision of water supply to the inhabitants of two residential blocks.

In 1995 a service contract was signed between the NWCPC and Gauff Consulting Engineers to support local authorities in the coastal town Malindi in billing and revenue collection. The contract was extended from seven and a half months to three and a half years. After its conclusion in 1999, a management contract was signed between Malindi Water Company and the private operator for a period of four years to support the company on technical and financial aspects.

The contract was regarded as successful and after it expired responsibility for service provision reverted to the public sector. In the small town of Tala in 1999, the Kangundo county council entered in a 30-year water provision contract with Romane Agencies Ltd. The contract foresees that 10% of revenues are to be paid to the town council. As of today, small improvements in service quality have been observed, but water coverage still remains a challenge.

=== Water sector arbitration ===
The 2002 Water Act also provided for the establishment of an independent Water Appeals Board to settle water-related disputes and conflicts. The Water Appeals Board was established in 2005 in Nairobi but since then only three cases have been determined. Five additional appeals are pending because the chair has resigned in March 2009 and the terms of two other board members have not been extended.

=== Civil society ===
Kenya has an active civil society including a number of local NGOs active in water supply and sanitation. Many of them are members of the Kenya Water and Sanitation Network (Kewasnet) founded in 2007. Among other activities, Kewasnet monitors service delivery, especially for the poor, and policy implementation on water sector reforms. It also "provides information to Kenyans to enable them to be engaged and involved in the management and decision-making mechanisms of the Water and Sanitation Sector". It also "promotes a culture of consumer responsibility that pays for supplied services from utility companies, safeguards water services infrastructure and equipment against vandalism by criminals."

One of the larger Kenyan NGOs active in water and sanitation is Maji Na Ufanisi (Water and Development). It is involved in community development and infrastructure construction in urban slums and in small towns, advocates for improved sector governance and carries out research. It was created in 1998 to take over the Kenya operations of WaterAid UK when the latter decided to close down its operations in Kenya.

=== WASH services for schools ===
A report in 2021 investigated water services at schools in Kenya. It found that the "responsibility for WASH services within schools at the county level remains ambiguous". Effective coordination between national and county governments is missing. Therefore, each school is individually responsible for managing its own delivery of WASH services. There is currently no effective monitoring and regulation for this process.

== Economic efficiency ==
The economic performance of Kenyan Water Service Providers is closely monitored by WASREB and made available in the Impact Report to encourage competition and spread best practices. Important indicators of economic efficiency are: collection rates, the level of non-revenue water, metering ratios and labour productivity. Most Kenyan Water Service Providers do not meet the benchmarks in these dimensions.

Collection rate. In 2013-14 most Kenyan WSPs recorded good revenue collection efficiencies with an average of 93%, up from 86% in 2006–07. The worst performing utility was Mawingo with 40% of the billed amount being collected. In some utilities, the collection rate exceeded 100% because WSPs were able to collect outstanding arrears.

Non-revenue water. On average, 42% of the supplied water in Kenya was not billed in 2013–2014, e.g. due to leakage or water theft. Only one Water Services Providers (Nyeri) met the benchmark set by the Ministry of Water and Irrigation with levels of NRW of less than 20%. In Nairobi NRW levels were 39%, in Mombasa 48%. Based on the unit cost of production, the nationwide losses due to non-revenue water in 2014 were estimated at KSh.5.2 billion/=, equivalent to US$52 million.

Metering ratio. The metering ratio of Kenyan water utilities was 89% in 2013–14, up from 82% in 2006–2007. There is, however, uncertainty about whether the installed water meters are in fact functioning. The metering ratio in Nairobi had been increased to 99% in 2006–07, but then declined again to 94% in 2013–14.

Labour productivity. In 2013–2014 there were on average 7 employees per 1000 water connections in Kenya, a significant improvement over 11 in 2006–07. Seven Water Service Providers, all of them large, attained good levels of labour productivity, with 5 or less workers per 1000 connections, up from only one in 2006–07.

== Financial aspects ==
=== Cost recovery ===
In 2014 the WSPs recovered, on average, 100% of operation and maintenance costs. However, all but four utilities fell short of the target to cover 150% of operation and maintenance costs in order to service debt and to develop their infrastructure. Water Services Boards should be cover their administrative costs through the Regulatory Levy they collect from WSPs in their service area. In fact, only Athi WSB was able to meet 115% of operational costs in 2006/2007. The other WSBs were still heavily reliant on government subsidies.

=== Tariff level ===
The average water tariff reported in 2014 was KSh 60 or US$ 0.60 per m^{3}. This figure is not very indicative because of significant regional variations and because in Kenya a progressive block tariff system is in place for household connections. This means that for the first 10 m^{3} a minimum charge is paid that corresponds to a low, highly subsidised tariff, while for the following blocks (up to 20, 50, 100 and 300 as well as above 300 m^{3}) an increasingly higher tariff is being charged, with the tariff in the highest block being five times higher than in the lowest block. Where no meter is installed, a fixed monthly charge is applied. The rationale for this system is to promote water saving practices and to ensure that low-income households can afford to use an adequate amount of water. However, there are problems with this system, because households in low-income areas resell water or share a connection with other households and thus risk ending up paying a higher tariff.

For example, in the rural area of Mwingi-North, water is taken from Kiambere Dam on the Tana River and sold to households that are not connected to piped water at a subsidised price of US$ 1 per m^{3} in 2014 (or KSh 2 per 20 litres). In the same area, water is also sourced from deep boreholes and natural rock catchments and sold at water kiosks for a price of US$ 1 to 2.5 per m^{3} (KSh 2 to 5 per 20 litres). Sometimes people have to buy water from water vendors but this is more expensive: US$ 2.5 to 10 per m^{3} (KSh 5 to 20 per 20 litres).

Information about tariffs at water kiosks is contradictory. A 2007 report about three Kenyan cities says that the unit rate for water kiosks was KSh.10/m^{3} in Nairobi, KSh.15/m^{3} in Mombasa, and KSh.55/m^{3} in Kisumu. However, the same report states earlier on that water kiosk users pay KSh.100/m^{3} in all three cities, which is said to be two to five times more than what is paid by those who get their water delivered to their homes through the network.

There is no sewer tariff in Kenya, so that properties connected to the sewer network receive this service for free, although sewerage and wastewater treatment is at least as expensive as drinking water supply. In 2013 a study commissioned by the regulator recommended the introduction of a 5% sewerage levy as a surcharge on the water bill.

Besides tariffs, Kenya has also introduced charges for the abstraction of groundwater and surface water.

=== Tariff adjustments ===
Tariff setting is the responsibility of Water Services Boards and Water Service Providers according to operation and maintenance costs. Tariffs have to be approved by WASREB, which can also mandate a WSB to formulate a tariff adjustment. There are three types of tariff adjustments, as described in the Tariff Guidelines: Regular Tariff Adjustments based on the WSPs' business plan; Extraordinary Tariff Adjustments when the cost structure undergoes significant changes; Automatic Tariff Adjustments every 12 months which might be part of a service provision agreement with a WSP.

In 2008 an Extraordinary Tariff Adjustment was granted to all WSPs as an interim measure to assist WSPs to meet their operation and maintenance costs. Tariffs for sewerage services are part of tariff adjustments and the aim is to reach full cost recovery also for sanitation. The ministry responsible for water is, however, aware that full cost recovery tariffs for sewerage for certain systems would make the service provision unaffordable for many connected households.

=== Investment ===
According to the Annual Water Sector Review 2013–14, investments in urban water and sanitation amounted to KSh.12 billion/= in 2013-14 (US$120m) compared to an investment need of around KSh.75 billion/= annually (US$750m). According to the Ministry of Water and Irrigation, its budget for drinking water supply and sanitation had been KSh.18.7 billion/= or US$242.8 million in Fiscal Year 2008–09, and thus had been higher than investments in 2013–14. In the preceding five years, the budget for the water sector had been increased by 245% from KSh.4.2 billion/= (US$54.5 million) in 2004–2005. 82% of funds were allocated for the water supply and sanitation sub-sector, while the rest was devoted to Water Resources Management, for Irrigation Drainage and Water Storage as well as Land Reclamation.

=== Financing ===
According to the regulator, "the overwhelming dependency on development partners (i.e. external donors) with over 94% of the total investment funds provided in 2013/14 (does) not augur well for the sector." The main sources of funding for Kenyan water institutions are three: government funds which had still constituted 58% of sector funding in 2008–2009, internally generated funds that had amounted to 11%, and donor contributions that made up 31% of the funds available at the time. One-third of the contributions by development partners were channelled through government budget, while the remaining two–thirds were disbursed outside the budget. Of the estimated donor funding for 2008–2009, 70% was in the form of loans, whereas grants represented 30%.

Funding for measures aimed at improving access to water and sanitation in areas without adequate services – especially areas inhabited by the poor – is provided by the Water Services Trust Fund (WSTF). The WSTF receives funds from the Government of Kenya and from donor agencies and directs them to the 362 poorest locations throughout the country (identified in collaboration with Water Services Boards).

=== Bill payment through mobile phones ===
Since 2009 Kenya's largest mobile phone company extended its mobile phone bank transaction payment system M-Pesa to be used for the payment of water utility bills. As of 2012 more than 12 million Kenyans and 85% of the urban population use mobile phones for Bank transactions. A study by the University of Oxford showed that prior to the introduction of this system residents of Kiamumbi on the outskirts of Nairobi had to make a 40-minute round trip on public transport, a wait in a lengthy queue to make a bank deposit and then present the slip at the offices of the water utility to pay their monthly bill. When the small utility serving the local water system allowed payments through M-Pesa in December 2010, within two months half their customers switched to the mobile phone payment system.

== External co-operation ==
Kenya receives external support from several donor agencies with a currently ongoing project volume of €627 million. The major donors are, namely, the African Development Bank, France, Germany, Sweden and Denmark, as well as the World Bank: Other donors include: the European Commission, Italy, Finland, Japan (through JICA), the Netherlands and UNICEF. External assistance is focused on urban water supply and sanitation, with much less activities in rural areas.

In October 2006 the Kenyan Government initiated a Sector-Wide Approach (SWAp) to harmonise the activities of the development partners, the co-ordination and the implementation of projects. The SWAp helps to improve the sector dialogue between the Ministry and the donors and to strengthen cross-sectoral links. A common sector policy framework, monitoring as well as a common sector program and strategy are being developed by the major donor agencies. Since 2007 an Annual Water Sector Review (AWSR) is carried out which helps to foster the alignment of donor projects among other things. The Development Partners have formed the Water Sector Technical Group (WSTG) to improve co-ordination and harmonisation among themselves, as well as a Water Sector Working Group (WSWG) to co-ordinate with the government. The WSTG is led by a troika and a chair that rotates on an annual basis. In 2012, the troika included Germany, the Netherlands and Sweden.

=== African Development Bank ===
The African Development Bank is present in the Kenyan water and sanitation sector with the following projects with a donor volume of around €70 million:

- The "Small Towns Water Supply & Waste" project (total project volume: €84.2 million), initiated in summer 2009, will focus in a period of four years on institutional development support, water supply and waste water infrastructure as well as water storage interventions in the Yatta area. The estimated number of beneficiaries will be 780,000.
- In spring 2009 the "Water Service Board Support Project" (total project volume: €61.5 million) started, which mainly boosts the institutional development of several Water Services Boards like the Lake Victoria South (LVSWSB), Northern Water (NWSB) or the Tana Water Services Board (TWSB) and which improves the water supply and sanitation in different regions.
- The "Rift Valley Water Supply and Sanitation" project (total project volume: €22.9 million), started in 2006, which will benefit 350.000 inhabitants in urban and rural centres within the Valley.
- The "Kisumu District Primary Schools Water and Sanitation Project" (total project volume: €0.22 million), started in summer 2007, with implementation centres on approximately 3,200 pupils and School Management Committees at the six participating schools.

=== France ===
The French Development Agency (AFD) supports the Kenyan water and sanitation sector through projects in Nairobi, Kisumu and Mombasa. In 2008 the total financing for on-going projects was €105 million, including a €40 million loan for Mombasa approved in 2008. In 2009 AFD approved a new €51 million loan for water supply and sanitation in Nairobi and Kisumu. In the past, the agency also financed projects in Kandara, Kahuti, Litein and Siaya.

=== Germany ===
Since 1975 Germany has supported the Kenyan water sector through the German Federal Ministry of Economic Cooperation and Development, which operates through GIZ in charge of technical co-operation and KfW in charge of financial co-operation. KfW has been nominated as the sector coordinator. Germany's ongoing programmes amount to approximately €80 million. The main development aid objective of the bilateral co-operation is to support sector institutions in ensuring sustainable and equitable access to safe water and sanitation in urban settings and to safeguard water resources. For example, GIZ contributes to the state target within its "Water Sector Reform Programme" from 2003 to 2013: The Project has several components such as: a) supporting the water ministry in sector reform b) regulation of the water sector and poverty-oriented financing commercialisation of water supply and sanitation c) commercialisation of water supply and sanitation d) capacity-building for the Water Resources Management Authority e) introduction of recycling-oriented sanitation (Ecosan).

=== Sweden and Denmark ===
Sweden, Denmark and Kenya have a long-standing co-operation in the water sector. Since 2005 Sweden, through the Swedish International Development Cooperation Agency (SIDA) together with Denmark, through the Danish International Development Agency (DANIDA), has supported the Kenya Water and Sanitation Programme (KWSP) which has had a total grant budget of US$80 million during 2005 – 2010. KWSP has supported the implementation of the water sector reforms, with a special focus on institution building, rural water supply and sanitation, and water resources management.

=== World Bank ===
The World Bank's "Water and Sanitation Service Improvement Project" for the period 2007–2012 in Kenya has a total loan volume of approximately $159 million. It supports the Athi Water Services, Coast Water Services and Lake Victoria North Services boards and, moreover, provides the Water Sector Regulatory Board and the Water Appeal Board with technical assistance. Besides investments in infrastructure the project also supports activities aimed at strengthening the commercial, financial and technical operations.

== Examples at county level ==
=== Kitui County ===
Kitui County is about 160 kilometers east of Nairobi City and has about 1,221,000 people. The two water service providers (WSPs) in the county are Kitui Water and Sanitation Company (KITWASCO) and Kiambere-Mwingi Water and Sanitation Company (KIMWASCO). They served only 32 percent of the county's population in 2017 and mainly only in urban areas, not so much in rural areas. Only about 42 percent of the population in Kitui County have access to at least a basic water service. In 2017, there were "3,126 equipped and non-equipped water sources spread across Kitui County". Equipped sources include hand pumps and piped schemes. Non-equipped sources include sand dams, earth dams, shallow wells and others. However, in a water audit carried out in 2017, only 60 percent of the water sources were fully functional.

About 400,000 people in Kitui rely on surface water as their main drinking water source and many people practice rainwater harvesting via roofs and gutters, rock catchments and sand dams. For these people, the extended dry period (June to October) creates water supply challenges. Groundwater resources, lifted by hand pumps or pumped to piped systems and water kiosks, offer a buffer against drought for many Kitui county residents. However there are issues with quality (natural salinity), infrastructure maintenance and functionality for these groundwater schemes.

Piped water schemes have fewer or no customers during the wet season because "users shift to using free surface and groundwater alternatives". The customers tend to shift to shallow wells during the wet season even though this exposes them to health risks.

The majority of schools in Kitui County have no handwashing facilities (53%). This causes a range of disadvantages for students, one of them being for adolescent girls to have to manage menstrual hygiene needs without access to handwashing facilities.

== Society and culture ==
=== Allegations of corruption ===
In September 2010, Water Minister Charity Ngilu admitted in Parliament that corruption was rampant in public water institutions, including all the eight water services boards and the National Water and Conservation Pipeline Corporation. The Kenya Water and Sanitation Civil Society Network (Kewasnet) called the statement the "height of hypocrisy and double standards", claiming that the Minister had only talked publicly about corruption in the sector after the Daily Nation newspaper had uncovered the corruption. Shortly before the chief executive officer of the Tanathi Water Services Board had been suspended after a WASREB audit of the board alleging corruption. The report had been published in March 2010 without action being taken for six months. According to Kewasnet, "governance in the water sector is at its worst and lowest ebb."

== See also ==
- Kenya water crisis
- Water kiosk
- Water supply and sanitation in Nairobi
- Water supply and sanitation in Sub-Saharan Africa
