= Mugo Gatheru =

Kenyan writer (1925–2011)

Reuel John Mugo Gatheru
- Born: Mugo Son of Gatheru; 21 August 1925; Kenya
- Died: 27 December 2011 (aged 86); Sacramento
- Education: St Joseph's Collegiate Junior College; Roosevelt University; Bethune-Cookman College; Lincoln University; New York University
- Occupation: Writer
- Writing career
- Genres: Autobiography; non-fiction

Reuel John Mugo Gatheru (21 August 1925 – 27 November 2011) was a Kenyan writer known for his 1964 memoir, Child of Two Worlds, which describes his early life in Kenya and his education abroad.

Mugo later became a history professor at California State University, Sacramento, where he taught from 1968 until 2002. He later authored a book on Kenyan history and another on Kikuyu folklore.

== Life ==
=== Early life and education ===
R.J. Mugo Gatheru, a member of the Ethaga clan of the Agĩkũyũ nation, was born on 21 August 1925 in Lumbwa, located in the Rift Valley Province of Kenya Colony. He was the eldest child of Gatheru-wa-Mugo and Wambui-wa-Kuria. In accordance with Kikuyu tradition, he was named after his paternal grandfather and referred to as Mugo-wa-Gatheru, meaning 'Mugo, son of Gatheru'.

Mugo's family lived as squatters on European farms and Forestry Department land. In 1936, aged 11, he started receiving a missionary education at Kahuti Elementary School, followed by Weithaga School near Fort Hall (now called Murang'a). Both schools were administered by the Church Missionary Society, and Mugo remained there until 1940. While studying there, the missionaries gave him the name 'Reuel John'.

In 1940, Mugo returned to his parents' home to participate in the irua circumcision ceremony. The following year, he enrolled at Kambui Primary School, located near Nairobi. Kambui was another missionary school, likely administered by the Gospel Missionary Society. Mugo sat for the Kenya Primary Examination in 1944 at Kambui and passed it successfully.

The following year, Mugo joined the Medical Research Laboratory in Nairobi. It was during his time there that he began to take a keen interest in colonial policy. He expressed his views in letters to The Kenya Weekly News, criticising their pro-settler stance. However, this bought him to the attention of the Criminal Investigation Department, which led Mugo to resign from his job at the Laboratory. During this time, he also began sending articles to the Associated Negro Press, although they did not publish them.

In 1947, and with the help of Eliud Mathu, Mugo secured a job with the Kenya African Union. This followed his first meeting with Jomo Kenyatta. He took up the role of assistant editor on their newspaper Mwafrika or The African Voice. His contributions included articles on the pass laws, colour bar, low wages, and poor housing conditions.

While working at The African Voice, Mugo corresponded with various people in the United States with the aim of trying to pursue higher education, following the examples of Peter Mbiyu Koinange and others. One of his letters caught the attention of St. Clair Drake, a professor at Roosevelt University, who was able to secure a scholarship for him. However, as his political views were known to the colonial authorities, Mugo was unable to obtain a visa to travel to the United States.

Mugo sought an alternative, enrolling at St Joseph's School, Allahabad, in 1949. He received support from friends and family to cover his costs. His father sold land, and a wealthy Arab businessman in Nairobi provided additional help. He stayed in India until 1950, when he travelled to England and then onwards to the United States, this time with financial support from an uncle and from church groups in America. But by the time Mugo reached Roosevelt he found that the university had cancelled his scholarship. Drake stepped in again, securing a scholarship for the summer of 1950 only. He then found Mugo a partial scholarship to attend Bethune-Cookman College. There, he took classes in sociology and political science, among others.

By 1951, Mugo was back in Chicago, having taken a job as a bus boy at a hotel near Lake Michigan. Drake then secured him a full scholarship to attend Lincoln University. At Lincoln, Mugo felt more settled as he was in the company of two Kikuyu friends, Kariuki Karanja Njiiri and George Mbugua Kimani.

=== Attempted deportation and further studies ===
On 23 September 1952, the United States Immigration Service questioned Mugo at Lincoln. He was suspected of having communist connections and of aiding the anti-colonial Mau Mau rebellion, which the following month would lead to Kenya Colony declaring a state of emergency. Mugo was then instructed to leave the country on 5 November 1952. Thurgood Marshall took a particular interest in the case, while the NAACP was concerned that if he was sent back to Kenya, he would be persecuted by the colonial government. Students and faculty supported Mugo, and his case garnered national attention. The Friends of Mugo Gatheru Fund was set up by Lincoln faculty, which received nearly $1000. Drake, once again, stepped in to help him to retain the services of a lawyer. In backing Gatheru, Drake limited his own academic prospects, as he alienated himself from a number of government officials and philanthropic foundations.

He was a brilliant African American man, and was very helpful to me. I felt very secure. I don’t know if I was closer to him or my two brothers.

— Mugo Gatheru, on St. Claire Drake

Mugo's case was finally resolved in the summer of 1957, when the United States Government dropped proceedings. Despite these legal problems, Mugo graduated from Lincoln in June 1954 with a BA in History and Political Science. He went on to postgraduate study at the Political Science Department of New York University, where he obtained an MA. In June 1956, he secured a job as a clerk at a credit rating agency.

=== Marriage and move to England ===
At the end of 1957, he met Dolores Pienkowski, and they married in October 1958, before Mugo was due to leave for England to study law. In November 1958, he left for England and enrolled at Gray's Inn, this time with financial assistance from William X. Scheinman, an American businessman. This assistance ended suddenly in 1960, which Mugo believed was at the behest of Tom Mboya. Mugo's belief was that Mboya targeted him in this way because he supported Munyua Waiyaki, who was running against Mboya at the 1960 general elections. Despite this, Mugo passed the Bar Examination Part One that year, following the birth of his first child. By the late 1950s, Mugo was working on a manuscript called The African Personality, the first six chapters of which he sent to Richard Wright for comment.

=== Child of two worlds ===
It's thrilling, in its own way: a straightforward account of the experiences of a Kikuyu searching for education; in fact, probably, the title should have been "A Fight for Education". I think it is important because of this very quality, this quality of fighting in the Kikuyu.

— Ngũgĩ wa Thiong'o on Child of Two Worlds

Mugo finished writing his autobiography in June 1963, just a few months before Kenya gained its independence. He closed with the line: "I shall shortly take my final examinations and I shall be home to help in the building of a new Kenya nation."

Child of Two Worlds was published in 1964 by Routledge & Kegan Paul in the UK and by Praeger in the United States. In 1966, it appeared as part of Heinemann's African Writers Series. The following year a German edition was released under the title Kind zweier Welten (trans. Albrecht Freiherr von Pölnitz, Munich: Claudius).

The book has been likened to other Kenyan autobiographies that appeared around the time of Mau Mau, including those by Josiah Mwangi Kariuki and Charity Waciuma. Elsewhere, it was received favourably in academic reviews. In a later analysis, Afejuke concludes:

Gatheru's style, his use of language, matches that of a writer whose narrative is a mixture of praise and lament, as Child of Two Worlds partly is; his use of language matches that of a communal poet or communal prose writer.

At around the same time as Child of Two Worlds was released in the African Writers Series, Gatheru submitted another manuscript to Heinemann, which was reviewed by Ngũgĩ wa Thiong'o. This was titled The Moulding of the New Kenya. The manuscript was still unpublished in 1975, but is likely the basis for his book, Kenya: from colonization to independence, 1888-1970, which was eventually published in 2005.

=== Academic career and death ===
I enjoy teaching very much. I believe trying to teach what l know is very rewarding. Helping to mold the younger generation is very important to me.

— Mugo Gatheru

By 1968, Gatheru had returned to the United States, taking up a teaching post at California State University, Sacramento. He remained at the university for over 30 years, teaching classes in African and Middle Eastern history.

Gatheru died on 27 November 2011, survived by his wife Dolores, two daughters, son-in-law, and two granddaughters.

== Work ==
- Gatheru, R. Mugo (1964). Child of Two Worlds: A Kikuyu's Story. London: Routledge & Kegan Paul..
- —— (1973). "Harry Thuku. An Autobiography". The International Journal of African Historical Studies. 6 (1): 175–176. doi:10.2307/217005. JSTOR 217005.
- —— (1975). "The Day the Knife Bit Me". In Dubaghian, Jane (ed.). Mirror of Man: Readings in Sociology and Literature. Little, Brown & Co. pp. 110–113.
- —— (2005). Kenya: From Colonization to Independence, 1888-1970. Jefferson, N.C.: McFarland. ISBN 9780786421992.
- —— (2005). From Beneath the Tree of Life: A Story of the Kenyan People of Ngai. London: Athena.

== Sources ==
- Afejuku, Tony E. (1992). "Language as sensation: The use of poetic and evocative language in five African autobiographies". Neohelicon. 19: 267–282. doi:10.1007/BF02028622. S2CID 145565376.
- Bejjit, Nourdin (2009). The Publishing of African literature: Chinua Achebe, Ngugi wa Thiong'o and the Heinemann African Writers Series 1962 - 1988 (PhD). The Open University. doi:10.21954/ou.ro.0000eb1c.
- Dudziak, Mary L. (2006). "Working toward Democracy: Thurgood Marshall and the Constitution of Kenya". Duke Law Journal. 56 (3): 721–780. JSTOR 40040559.
- Fyfe Stephens, Robert (2013). Kenyan Student Airlifts to America 1959-1961: An Educational Odyssey. Nairobi: East African Educational Publishers. ISBN 9789966259301.
- Fuccillo, Carol (1990). "Professor E xp erien ces Living History". State Hornet. 47 (26): 25.
- Gershenhorn, Jerry (2013). "St. Clair Drake, Pan-Africanism, African Studies, and the politics of knowledge, 1945–1965". The Journal of African American History. 98 (3): 422–433. doi:10.5323/jafriamerhist.98.3.0422. JSTOR 10.5323/jafriamerhist.98.3.0422. S2CID 147729436.
- Harper, Jim C. (2005). Western-Educated Elites in Kenya, 1900-1963: The African American Factor. Taylor & Francis. ISBN 9781135512804.
- Kilson, Martin L. (1953). "Mugo-Son-of-Gatheru". The Crisis. 60 (3): 140–144.
- Kiuchi, Toru; Hakutani, Yoshinobu (2013). Richard Wright: A Documented Chronology, 1908-1960. McFarland. ISBN 9781476602448.
- Meriwether, James H. (1998). "African Americans and the Mau Mau Rebellion: Militancy, Violence, and the Struggle for Freedom". Journal of American Ethnic History. 17 (4): 63–86. JSTOR 27502337.
- Middleton, John (1966). "Child of Two Worlds: A Kikuyu's Story". American Anthropologist. 68 (1): 283–284. doi:10.1525/aa.1966.68.1.02a00810. JSTOR 668137.
- Neubauer, Carol E. (1983). "One Voice Speaking for Many: The Mau Mau Movement and Kenyan Autobiography". The Journal of Modern African Studies. 21 (1): 113–131. doi:10.1017/S0022278X00023065. JSTOR 160618. S2CID 154089309.
- "Reuel Mugo-Gatheru Obituary". The Sacramento Bee. 27 November 2012.
- "Student from Kenya faces ouster by U.S." The New York Times. 5 December 1952.
- "Student news and notes" (PDF). Lincoln University Bulletin. 56 (2): 12. 1953.
- Oeltjen, Pam (1996). "History professor caught between two worlds". State Hornet. 54 (54): 1.
- Queen, Millie (1975). "College goes to high school". State Hornet. 27 (48): 3.
- Sander, R.; Lindfors, B, eds. (1996). Ngũgĩ wa Thiong'o Speaks: Interviews with the Kenyan Writer. Oxford: James Currey.
- Weeks, Sheldon (1965). "A Kikuyu's Story". Africa Today. 12 (3): 16. JSTOR 4184616.
