= Water supply and sanitation in Mongolia =

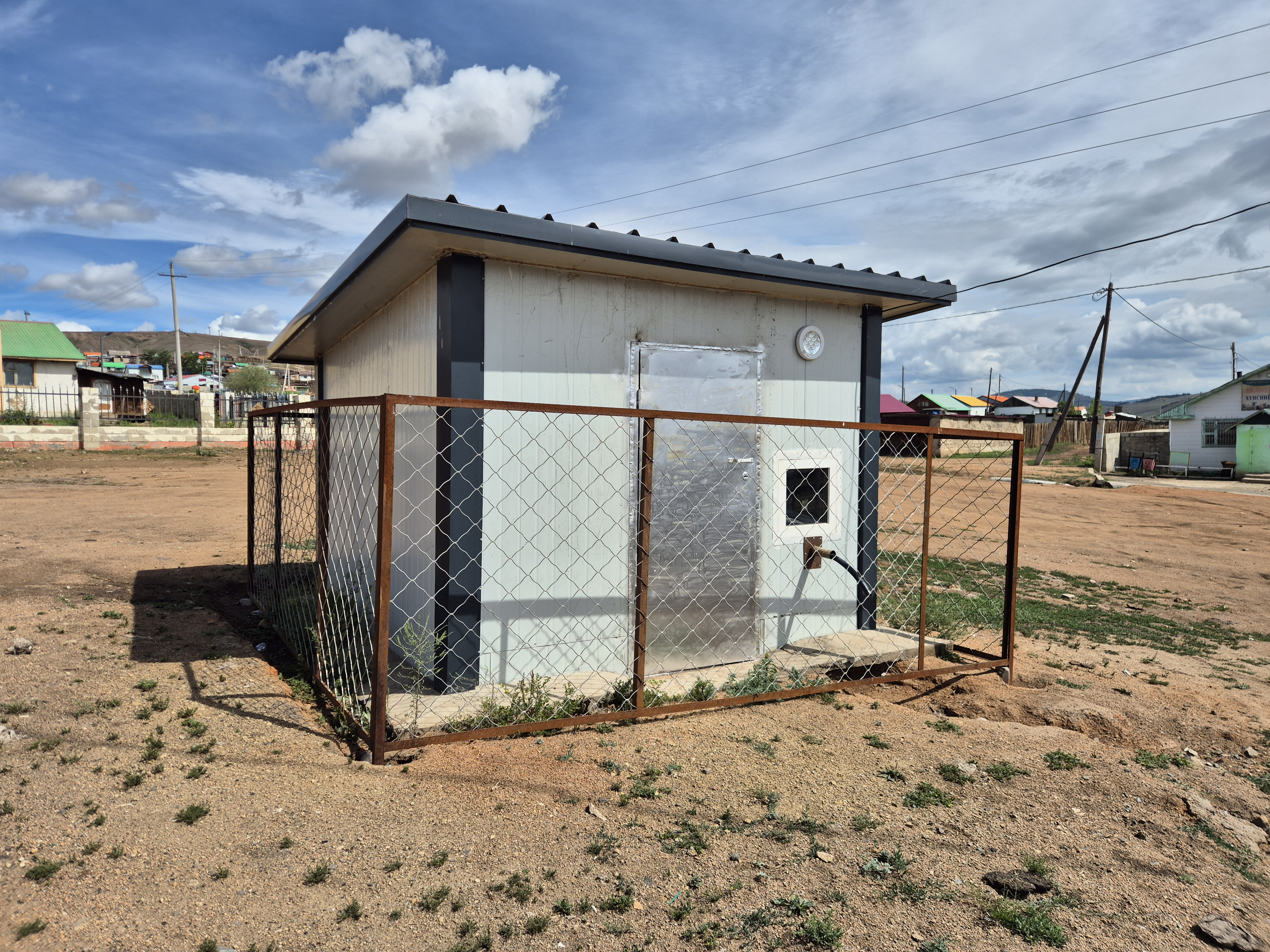
Water kiosk in Sharyngol, Darkhan-Uul

Water supply and sanitation in Mongolia refers to the water supply and sanitation in Mongolia.

== Water resources ==
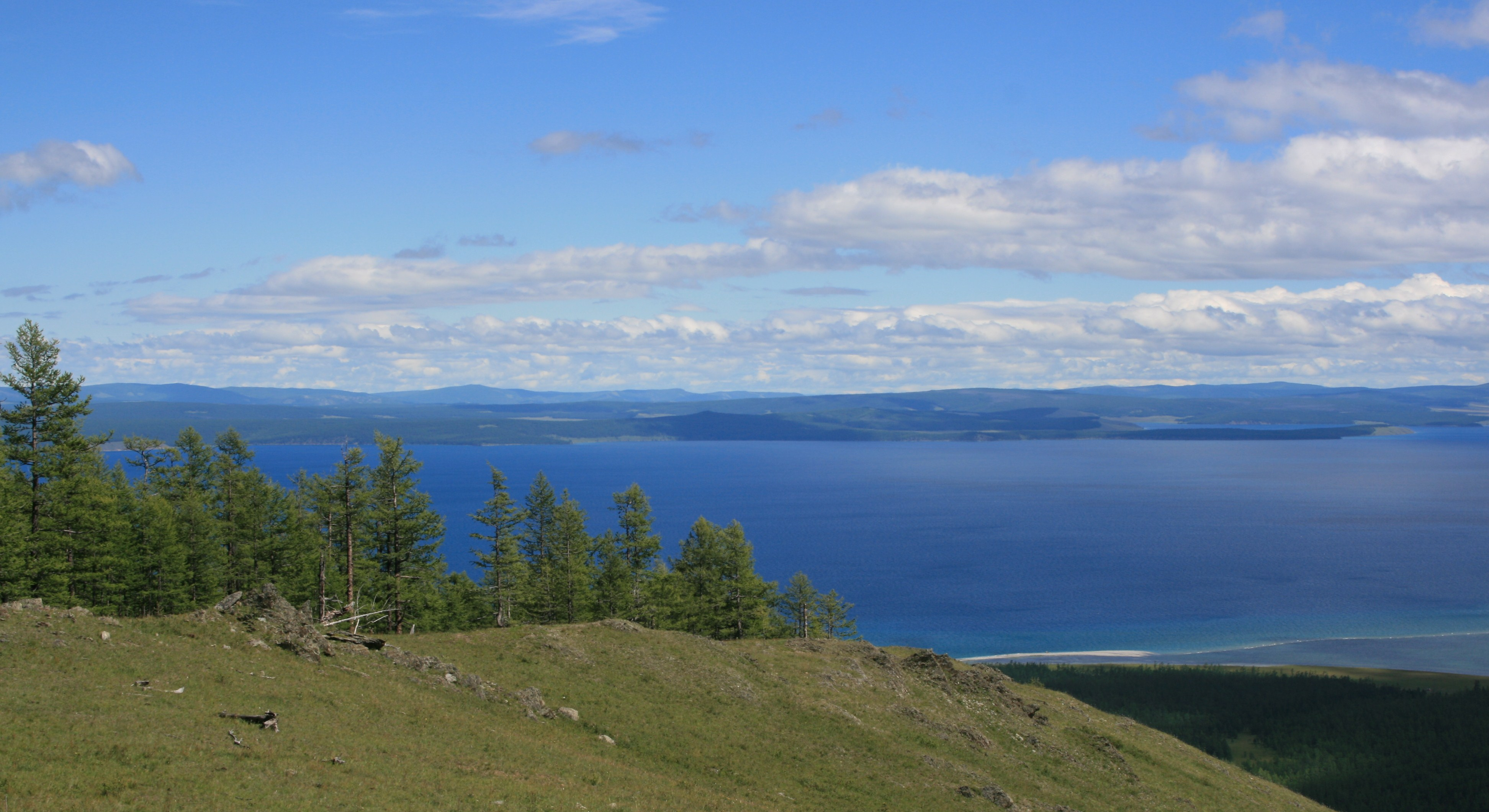
Lake Khövsgöl

The average annual available surface water in Mongolia is 2,091 million m^{3}. During dry season, the availability is 1,294 million m^{3}. Around 75% of available surface water in Mongolia is stored in lakes, with the largest availability is in Lake Khövsgöl in Khövsgöl Province.

== Water consumption ==
The total use of water in Mongolia in 2018 was 560 million m^{3}. Agriculture used 40%, industry used 25%, livestock used 19% and domestic sectors used 16%.

=== Ger districts ===
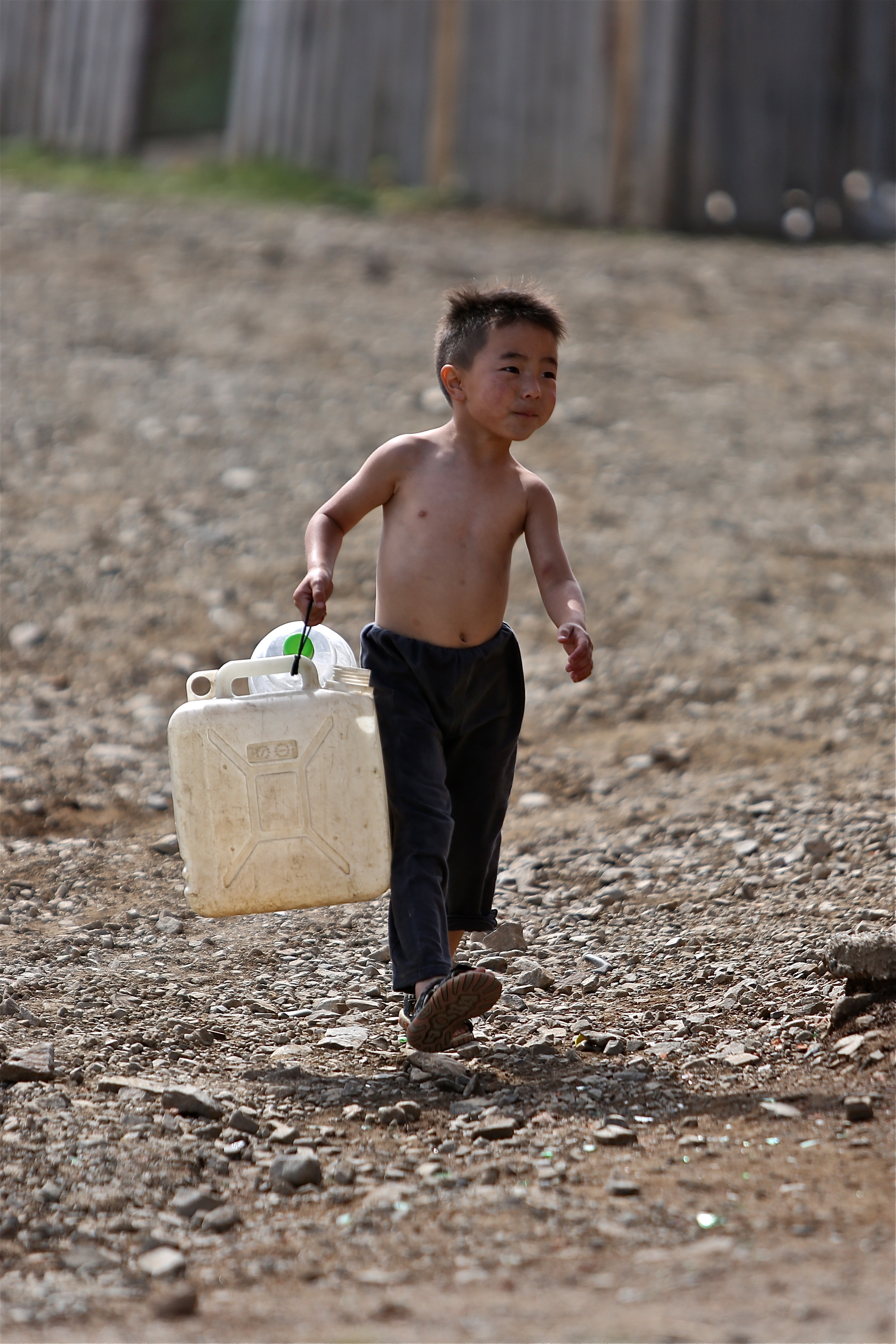
A child in ger district carrying empty containers to get water from water kiosk

In Ger districts, residents obtained water from nearby water kiosks, due to the absence of water supply pipelines to the ger's individual residential buildings and structures. Water kiosks are usually connected to the nearby water supply pipelines for its water sources. In the absence of pipelines, water at water kiosks is brought in by water trucks.
