= Intermittent water supply =

Continuity of water less than 24 hours a day

A piped water supply and distribution system is intermittent when water continuity is for less than 24 hours a day or not on all days of the week. During this continuity defining factors are water pressure and equity. At least 45 countries have intermittent water supply (IWS) systems. It is contrasted with a continuous or "24/7" water supply, the service standard. No system is intentionally designed to be intermittent, but they may become that way because of system overexpansion, leakage and other factors. As of 2022, there was no feasible method for modelling IWS, including no computer-aided tools. Contamination issues can be associated with an intermittent water distribution system. Global public health impact includes millions of cases of infections and diarrhea, and 1560 deaths annually.

A continuous supply is not practical in all situations. In the short term, an IWS may have some benefits. These may include addressing demand with a limited supply in a more economical manner. An intermittent supply may be temporary (e.g., when water reserves are low) or permanent (e.g., where the piped system cannot sustain a continuous supply). Associated factors resulting from an intermittent supply include water extraction by users at the same time, resulting in low pressure and a possibly higher peak demand.

== Prevalence ==
About 41 percent of urban water supply systems around the world are intermittent; a critical misutilization considering the fact that these systems are designed to run continuously (i.e., 24 hours a day). About 1.3 billion people have a piped supply that is intermittent, including large populations in Africa, Asia, and Latin America and the Caribbean. This does not include those who do not get piped water at all, about 2.7 billion people. Countries with intermittent supply in some areas and continuous supply in others include India and South Africa. In India, various cities are at various stages of constructing 24/7 supply systems, such as Chandigarh, Delhi, Shimla, and Coimbatore. In Cambodia, Phnom Penh increased coverage from 25% to 85% and duration from 10 to 24 hours a day between 1993 and 2004.

== Storage ==
Installation of storage and pumps at residences may offset the intermittency of the water supply. Roof tanks are a common feature in countries where the water supply is intermittent. In Jordan, most houses have one or more ground or roof tanks. An intermittent supply can be supplemented with other non-piped sources such as packaged drinking and cooking water bought from local shops or delivered to the house.

== See also ==
- Water scarcity
