= Kahuti =

- Location within Kenya
- Coordinates: 0.7°S 36.97°E
- Country: Kenya
- Province: Central Province
- Time zone: UTC+3 (EAT)

Kahuti is a settlement in Kenya's Central Province. It is located at the junction between the newly reconstructed C72 road and the Kahuti Githiga B road. Kahuti is also the home of the late statesman and politician Dr. Julius Gikonyo Kiano who was born in the nearby village of Githiga.
