= Water kiosk =

Small scale business in African villages

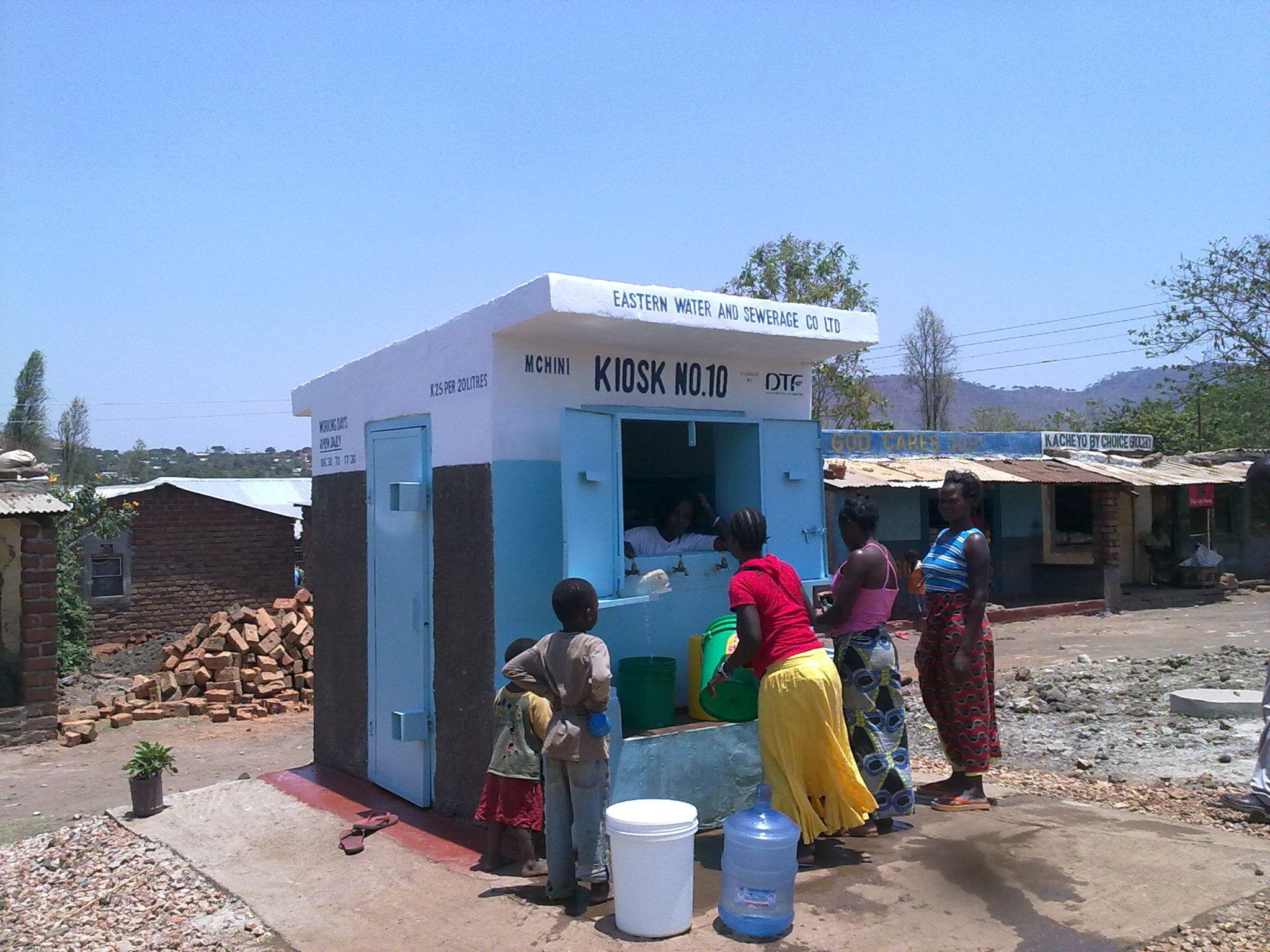
A water kiosk in Chipata

Water kiosks are booths for the sale of tap water. They are common in many countries of Sub-Saharan Africa. Water kiosks exist, among other countries, in Cameroon, Haiti, Kenya, Malawi, Mongolia, Tanzania and Zambia.

== Description ==
Water kiosks typically have four taps on the outside and faucets inside, operated by a kiosk attendant. They typically receive treated water from utilities through a piped distribution network. Where water supply in the network is intermittent, kiosks sometimes also have a water storage tank. In rural areas, water for kiosks can sometimes come directly from a well, spring, stream or lake after treatment. . An example for a kiosk supplied from a lake is a village near Gona dam in Kenya.

== Management and sustainability ==
Kiosks can be operated by employees of utilities, by self-employed operators under contract with utilities, or by water committees consisting of volunteers. Kiosk operators also sell other goods at the kiosk to increase their meager income. A water kiosk can serve between 500 and 3,000 people. Water is typically carried home from the kiosk in buckets of 20 liters. The sale price can be a flat rate per household or, more typically, a price per bucket which is advertised at the kiosk.

Making water kiosks commercially viable is more difficult where population density is low and where there are alternative often low-quality, free water sources such as shallow wells, ponds or streams. Low awareness of the health benefits of clean water can exacerbate these problems. In those conditions, kiosks are at greater risk of failing. Involving communities in deciding about the location of kiosks, their opening hours and the choice of the kiosk operators increases the likelihood of the kiosks being accepted and functioning well. If operators have a contract with the utility, regular supervision is important to ensure that the contract stipulations concerning cleanliness of the premises, prices charged and opening hours are respected.

== Experiences ==
=== Kenya:Regularization of informal kiosks in Kibera ===
In Kibera, Nairobi's largest slum, water kiosks have existed since the 1970s. Kiosks are privately owned and the owners financed the construction of the kiosks and the pipes to the water mains. Water is supplied by the Nairobi utility but is often not paid for by the kiosk owners. In 1998 there were about 650 kiosks in Kibera. Although two thirds of the kiosks have water reservoirs, often water is not available due to supply interruptions. In 2003, when a new water law was passed, the government threatened to shut down kiosks that were not properly registered. As a result, kiosk owners formed an association and engaged in a dialogue with the government to defuse the situation by paying arrears and being officially recognized.

=== Zambia:Successful country-wide program ===
In Zambia, where kiosks were introduced in 2006, there were about 300 kiosks in 2008 serving 500,000 people. According to the World Bank and the German development agency GIZ they are a success. More than half the kiosk operators in Zambia are women. The utilities have set up so-called "peri-urban units" that control the kiosk operators every two weeks and replace operators that are in breach of their contract. The tariff charged is 1 Euro Cent per 20 liter.

=== Haiti:Success in the capital, mixed results in towns ===
In Port-au-Prince, Haiti, water kiosks have been operated successfully in low-income neighborhoods through water committees since the mid-1990s. The water committees use about a third of their revenues to pay for water provided by the utility and one third for other operating costs. The remaining third is used for community activities. However, water kiosks in other towns have been abandoned. Some have struggled, because nearby households receive water through unmetered house connections for a flat rate and resell water to neighbors, thus depriving the kiosks of clients.

=== Malawi:Failure and a new attempt ===
In Lilongwe, the capital of Malawi, water kiosks have failed at one moment. 49 kiosks were set up in four neighborhoods and each kiosk was managed by a committee of three people. However, some committees misappropriated funds, while some community members got free water through illegal piped connections directly to their homes. Some kiosks charged flat rates per month independently of consumption, but users often failed to pay. When some committees did not pay the utility, the latter threatened to shut down 27 water kiosks. The NGO WaterAid conducted a survey to assess the situation and recommended that the Malawi Water Authority establishes a designated kiosk unit to liaise with the committees running the kiosks.

=== Other examples ===
In Douala, Cameroon, and Dar es-Salaam, Tanzania, the tariff for water sold at kiosks is about 3 Euro Cent per 20 liter. This is still much lower than the prices charged by water vendors which the poor had to pay prior to the construction of the kiosks.
