= 2013 Laikipia local elections =

Local elections in Kenya

Local elections were held in Laikipia County on 4 March 2013. Under the new constitution, which was passed in a 2010 referendum, the 2013 general election was to be the first where there would be election of county governors and their deputies for the 47 newly created counties. They were also the first general elections run by the Independent Electoral and Boundaries Commission(IEBC) which released the official list of candidates.

== Gubernatorial election ==
Candidate	Running Mate	Coalition	Party	Votes
Irungu, Joshua Wakahora	Kabugi, Josphat Gitonga Hon Josephat Gitonga Kabugi		The National Alliance	21,561 (57.4%)
Kamau, Richard Mburu	Shuel, Joseph Njalis		Agano Party	1,883 (5.0%)
Kiunjiri, Festus Mwangi	Gichuhi, David Maina		Grand National Union	10,889 (29.0%)
Muriithi, Ndiritu	Putunoi, Jane Tingis		United Democratic Forum Party	3,257 (8.7%)

== Prospective candidates ==
The following are some of the candidates who made public their intentions to run:

- Mwangi Kiunjuri - MP for Laikipia East Constituency and assistant minister for Public Works
- Nderitu Mureithi - MP for Laikipia West Constituency and assistant minister for Industrialisation
- Joshua Irungu - a community development specialist
- Mburu Kamau - Businessman
