= Laikipia (disambiguation) =

Laikipia may refer to:

- Laikipiak people, were a community that inhabited the plateau located on the eastern escarpment of the Rift Valley in Kenya that today bears their name
- Laikipia County, a Kenyan county, located on the Equator in the former Rift Valley Province of the country
  - Laikipia East Constituency
  - Laikipia North Constituency
  - Laikipia West Constituency
- Laikipia Air Base
- Laikipia University
- Laikipia Plateau, a plateau and geographic region in Kenya

== Others ==
- Laikipia (duo), British-American electronic duo made up of Xander Rawlins and Taylor Harrison
