= John Mwaniki =

Kenyan politician

2nd Deputy Governor of Laikipia County
- In office 28 August 2017 – 25 August 2022
- Preceded by: Gitonga Kabugi
- Succeeded by: Reuben Kamuri

Personal details
- Party: Jubilee Party

John Mwaniki is a politician and project management consultant, who served as the second Deputy Governor of Laikipia County, from 2017 to 2022, during the tenure of Ndiritu Muriithi. Prior to that he was the County secretary of the County Government of Laikipia from 2015 to 2016, during the first term of Governor Joshua Irungu, leaving the post after a protracted dispute with the then governor. While Deputy Governor he served as the chairperson of the Kenyan Deputy Governor's forum, being elected by his fellow deputy governors to the position in 2018
