= 2008–2009 Kenya drought =

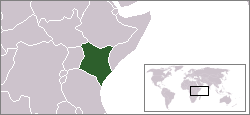
- Location of Kenya
- Country: Kenya, Somalia, Ethiopia, Eritrea, Uganda, Djibouti
- Location: East Africa
- Period: 2008, 2009, early 2010
- Theory: severe drought, irregular rainfall
- Effect on demographics: 11 million people affected

Between 2008 and early 2010, Kenya, one of the countries of Eastern Africa, was affected by a severe drought, which put ten million people at risk of hunger and caused a large number of deaths to livestock in Kenyan Arid and Semi-Arid Lands (ASALs), constituting around 88% of the country.

The areas which experienced the worst effects were Northern Kenya, Somalia and Southern Ethiopia, most severely in Kajiado and Laikipia. These predominantly pastoral regions reported deaths of up to half of the livestock. Droughts in Kenya have become more frequent causing crop failures and devastation as three-quarters of the population are sustained by agriculture.

== Background ==
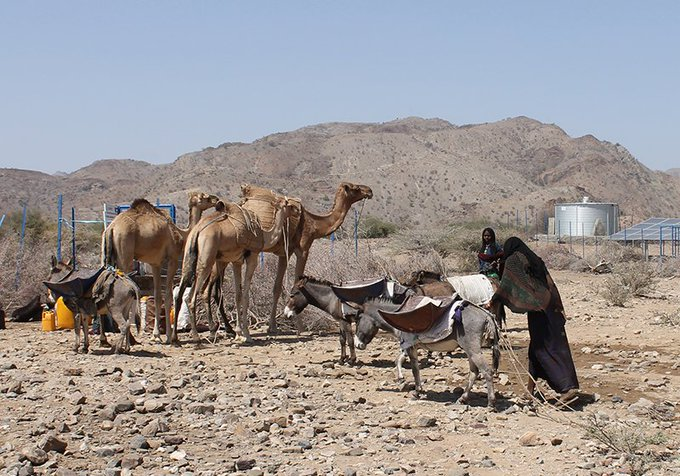
Transporting water in arid areas of Kenya

Owing to the lack of annual rainfall, the arid and semi-arid lands of Kenya (ASALs) are very susceptible to drought and flooding. These lands are impacted by the increasing effects of climate change and the risk of desertification. Water scarcity leaves unimproved water supplies for the majority of the population, so these places tend to be marginalized, and have high rates of poverty.

Kenya experienced limited rainfall in 2008 from October to December, followed by a similar situation in 2009. The Kenyan Red Cross conducted assessment reports indicating the risk of starvation for millions of Kenyans, resulting in an appeal to the international donor community for food aid.

Kenya has been supported by a drought management system since 1980. The system includes policies and strategies, an early warning system, a funded contingency plan, and overall drought coordination and response structure. Despite that, at the end of the 2008–2009 drought, the European Union delegation considered that a review of the responses to this drought would have been appropriate, in order to strengthen the efficiency of the drought management and alleviate its consequences. The system became the responsibility of the National Drought Management Authority, established in 2011.

== Effects ==
=== Food security ===
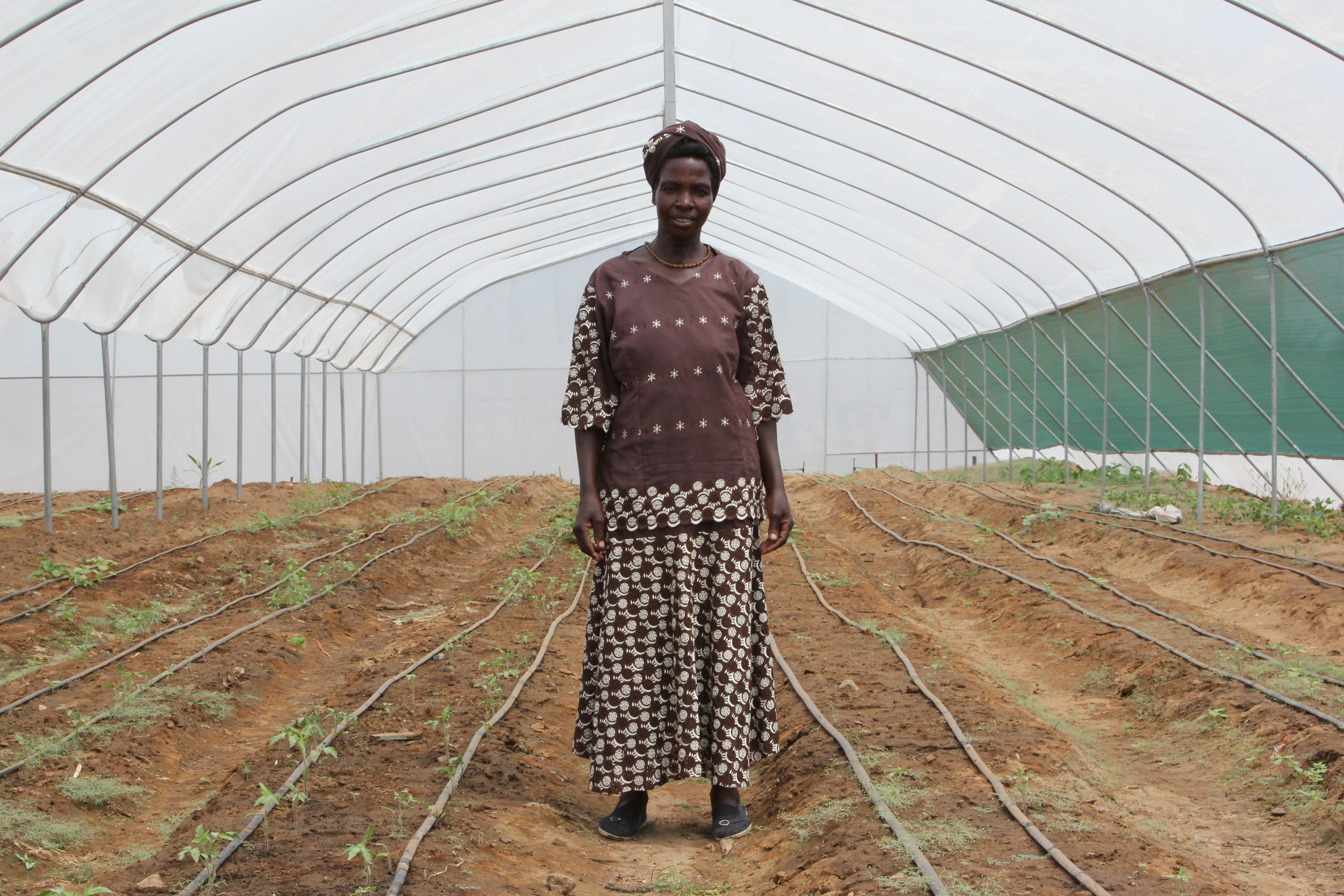
Mothers improving food security in Kenya

Agriculture supports around 75% of the Kenyan population and accounts for 25.9% of the GDP, making it one of the leading means of sustenance of the country and a significant contributor to employment and food security; on the other hand, droughts caused by climate change have put a strain on agriculture and the country itself to the extent that in January 2009 the Government declared a state of emergency, because ten million Kenyans needed food aid after a poor harvest.

In the North of the country, by April, 30% of the population was suffering from acute malnutrition because the "long rains" of 2009 failed, and some areas of the country were already worn out by five years of consecutive droughts.

The shortage of food was also worsened by a political crisis caused by a disputed election in early 2008. This provoked a climate of violence in the East of the country which drove away farmers who were unable to return in time to plant maize in the planting season. This led to food, water, and power shortages throughout the country.

In 2011 the USAID youth program, which works closely with Feed the Future, brought groups of young mothers together to improve food security, working on nutrition. Cultivating vegetables and legumes they have been improving their health and that of their infants, in a shared urban farm in Mombasa. Making sure that children are well-fed is eminent as malnutrition in childhood and pregnancy has many adverse consequences for child survival and long-term well-being. Food-borne illnesses are often caused by bacteria, viruses, and other pathogens that affect human health. Food security issues were also created by violations in trade standards, resulting in the exclusion of food from international, regional, and local markets.

=== Effects on the Maasai pastoralists ===
In Kenya, pastoralism represents a mainstay source of sustenance, providing livelihood, security, and employment opportunities (around 90% of the population). It is impacted by droughts, that directly impact livestock assets of pastoral households.

Maasai pastoralists are traditionally semi-nomad and practice seasonal transhumance from dry to wet season pastures. The severe drought of 2009 has prompted pastoralists in Northern Kenya to abandon their traditional lifestyles (like in the 2005 drought) due to the harsh living conditions and the destruction of their pastures by drought, overgrazing, and soil erosion. In conditions of extreme drought, some pastoralists tried to dig down into dry riverbeds and water pans looking for water and others moved onto highland pastures in Mt. Kenya. These responses were eventually unsuccessful due to the increasing number of livestock deaths (it is estimated that over 38,000 cattle died). The high number of losses also constituted a social implication for the Maasai, who as a tradition measure their wealth on the dimension of their herds. Due to the high mortality rate at the time, there was a major decline in livestock. This raised the prices of milk and other livestock items, which adversely affected hunger levels and lowered income levels. Land degradation also increased due to livestock competition from pastures and water.

To cope with the drought in the short term the Maasai developed four strategies. The first was to take their animals to graze very early in the morning when the grass is covered with dew. The second was to guard reserve pastures on their higher lands while the grass regenerated so that it can be used during drought. The third strategy was to increase the length of their migrations as the gravity of the drought worsened. The last method was to dig shallow wells in dry riverbeds during migrations to acquire water.

Two long-term solutions were developed. The first was to keep livestock of mixed-species; in addition to the traditional herd composed by grazers (cattle and sheep) and browsers (goats), pastoralists added donkeys and camels. Different animal species adapt differently to drought and this method ensured that at least part of the herd survived in a specific climatic event. The second method was to increase the size of their herds during wetter periods, so they have some animals left at the end of a drought period.

=== Micro-climate ===
Köppen–Geiger climate classification map for Kenya 1980–2016

Climate change has been playing an important role in Kenya's droughts, reducing the drought cycle from every ten years to annual events. When the cycle of droughts in Kenya occurred every ten years, farmers had recovery time to rebuild their livestock and crops before the next drought. When the recovery time dropped to two years, this recovery was no longer possible.

Dryness is not the only outcome of climate change: rains have decreased during the long rainy season (from March to May), but have registered an increase from September to February causing an extension of the normal rainfall period (October to December), which, together with growing intensity and strength, has created vulnerability to floods.

The table below displays data of the average monthly rainfall of Kenya from 1901 to 2016, compared with the predicted changes for 2080–2099.

Rainfall Data Projection
Rainfall (mm)	January	February	March	April	May	June	July	August	September	October	November	December
1901–2016	29.80	26.45	61.06	129.83	91.69	37.04	20.71	30.88	28.53	57.13	93.69	51.81
2080–2099	45.24	36.49	72.73	134.44	92.68	38.12	29.47	31.34	32.86	67.70	126.32	86.73

Köppen–Geiger climate classification map for Kenya, forecast 2071–2100

It is expected that the annual average temperature of the territory of Kenya will increase by 1.0 °C to 2.8 °C by 2060, with greater effects in the tea production, but a negative impact on crop and maize revenues.

Data showing the actual and predicted mean annual temperature increase is shown for the period 1901 to 2099:

Temperature Data Projection
Temperature (°C)	January	February	March	April	May	June	July	August	September	October	November	December
1901–2016	24.68	25.51	25.87	25.17	24.30	23.23	22.60	22.97	23.79	24.65	24.41	24.31
2080–2099	27.77	28.87	29.25	28.85	27.80	26.88	26.24	26.63	27.34	27.93	27.62	27.51

The Rift Valley Province is particularly sensitive to climate change. It is predicted that coastal areas will suffer from rising sea levels from which floods and saltwater intrusions will result, due to the melting of glaciers which will further reduce the availability of water.

=== The effects on wildlife ===
Due to the drought animals were dying, some from starvation, others of thirst and many because their weak immune systems could not fight disease or infection.

By September 2009, at least 60 elephants and hundreds of animals had died in the country.

There was a conflict between locals and wildlife due to the absence of land. Consequently, the pastoralists took their herds illegally into the national parks and wildlife reserves, in a search for grazing land and water. The pastoralists felt betrayed by their government because they thought that the interests of the tourists who come to see the wildlife had been put before their own. They questioned why they had to allow wildlife on to their land but could not legally use the parks and reserves for grazing at such difficult times.

=== The effects on the GDP ===
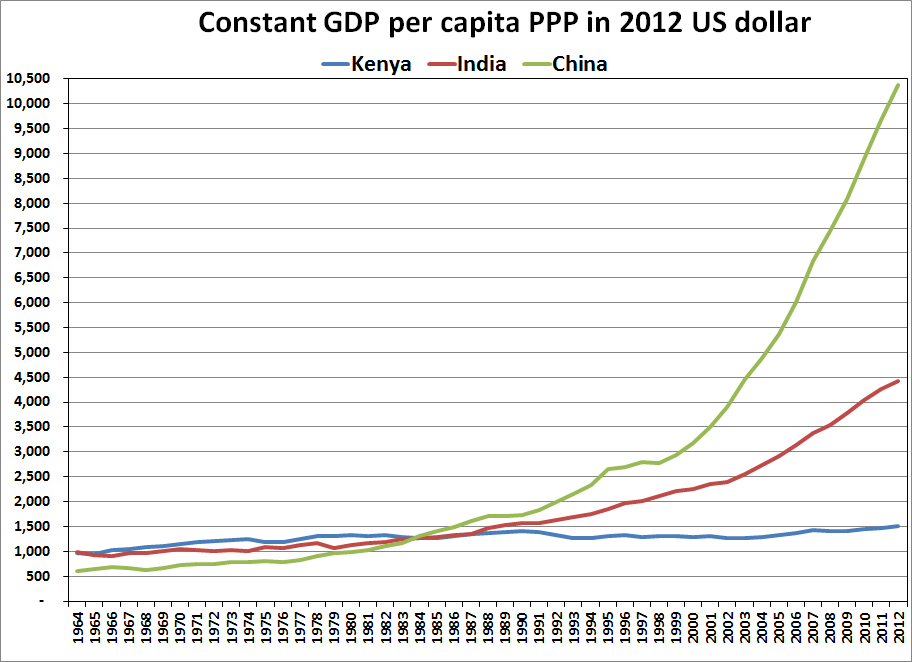
Kenya's GDP 1964–2012

Before the 2008 drought, the Kenyan economy had been growing at relatively high annual rates ranging from 6 to 7 per cent, and it was expected to continue on the same path during the following years. The annual growth rate fell to 1.5 per cent because of the drought. Despite the growth they worked for in the construction sector, tourism and agriculture faced very high declines (-36 and -5 per cent, respectively), and inflation rose to an unprecedented annual rate of 26.2 per cent.

In 2009, the government designed certain steps to promote growth in order to increase the GDP. These initiatives included restoration of investor confidence, an expansionary fiscal policy through a stimulus package, and monetary policy focus to preserve price stability at a single-digit rate. They were able to make the GDP rise by 2.6% with this method. The agriculture sector contracted by 2.7% due to the drought, high costs of inputs, and depressed demand for some of the country's exports due to the 2008 financial crisis.

In 2011, the GDP reached 10.06% due to the strong performance of the financial sector, construction and tourism. The population was also facing a high annual rate of inflation caused by rising food and fuel prices, which appeared to affect the poor disproportionately. The combination of four factors was also threatening the Kenyan economy: high fuel prices, high food prices, the drought in the Horn of Africa, and the Euro crisis.

== Responses ==
The main financial contributors in efforts were ALRMP (Arid Lands Resource Management Project) and the government; these organizations are designated a significant role under the country's drought management system.

ALRMP funded 83% of interventions and provided for 46% of total expenditure on drought response; 62% of the total transactions audited during 2007–2008 were suspected to be fraudulent or questionable. Among the funds, foreign donors accounted for 8%. This is likely to be an underestimation because cost information for two-thirds of the projects funded by these donors were not available. Government accounted for 29% of spending, but just 6% of programs, reflecting the high cost of the commercial interventions for de-stocking.

=== Water related responses ===
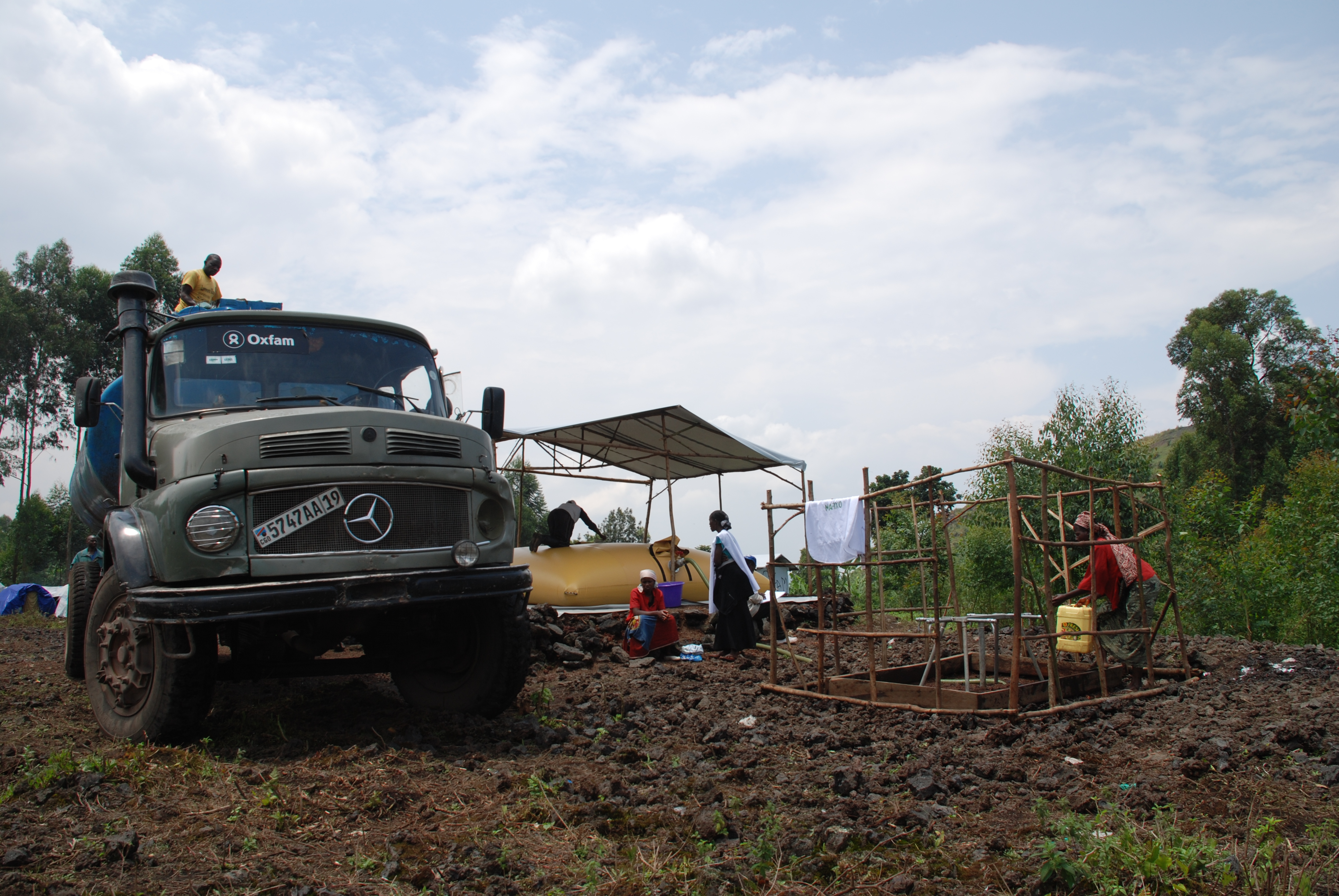
Trucking clean and safe water to East Africa

Most water tankering interventions were not providing adequate supplementary water to justify the cost involved. The amount of that water in the communities was relatively limited, not even coming close to the MoWI’s suggested standard of 10 litres (2.2 imp gal) per person per day.

In Dol Dol, the people were able to remain in the villages even though starvation had not been completely eradicated. Clean water tanks were distributed to the communities, who used it to cook their food, removing the need to walk 20 kilometres (12 mi) to fetch water (6:00 to 15:00 every day). The farm animals had access to water, but the impact was minimal as most died anyway.

There were two limits of the intervention. Firstly, the water supplied was not enough for all the inhabitants. Only those who lived near the roads could be helped, because the arid terrain made moving to the inner villages too risky. Secondly, whoever managed to acquire the water could only use it for cooking and drinking, because there was not enough to be used for chores such as washing clothes or bathing. They mostly targeted women and schools for water support, rather than the adult male population, therefore the community estimated only about 10 per cent of the population benefited. In Merti, Isiolo, the community also felt that the use of a Bowser (tanker) helped the people that were left in the villages, whilst the animal breeders were forced to migrate with their animals, looking for other natural sources.

=== Commercial destocking responses ===
By the height of the drought in mid-2008, few measures had been implemented. Most of the effective measures occurred in 2009. Compared to other measures, de-stocking, restocking and animal health interventions began relatively late. All de-stocking options were carried out after June 2009, when the drought had reached its worst stage. After June, 63% of all measures were introduced, 77% related to animal feeding, 70% to borehole development/maintenance, and 54% for peace-building.

The Kenyan government began carry out de-stocking operations in May 2009. Effective contributions made from NGOs started later in the year, from July 2009. ALRMP, which began to contribute to interventions by the Kenyan government, was the only exception to this latency of action by the key members. 49% of the total expenditure on livestock-related drought intervention between 2008 and 2009 was accounted for by conventional livestock interventions, which mainly included feed, health, and de-stocking. The Kenyan government and ALRMP were the biggest investors, highlighting the contributions made by organizations in the Kenyan drought management system.

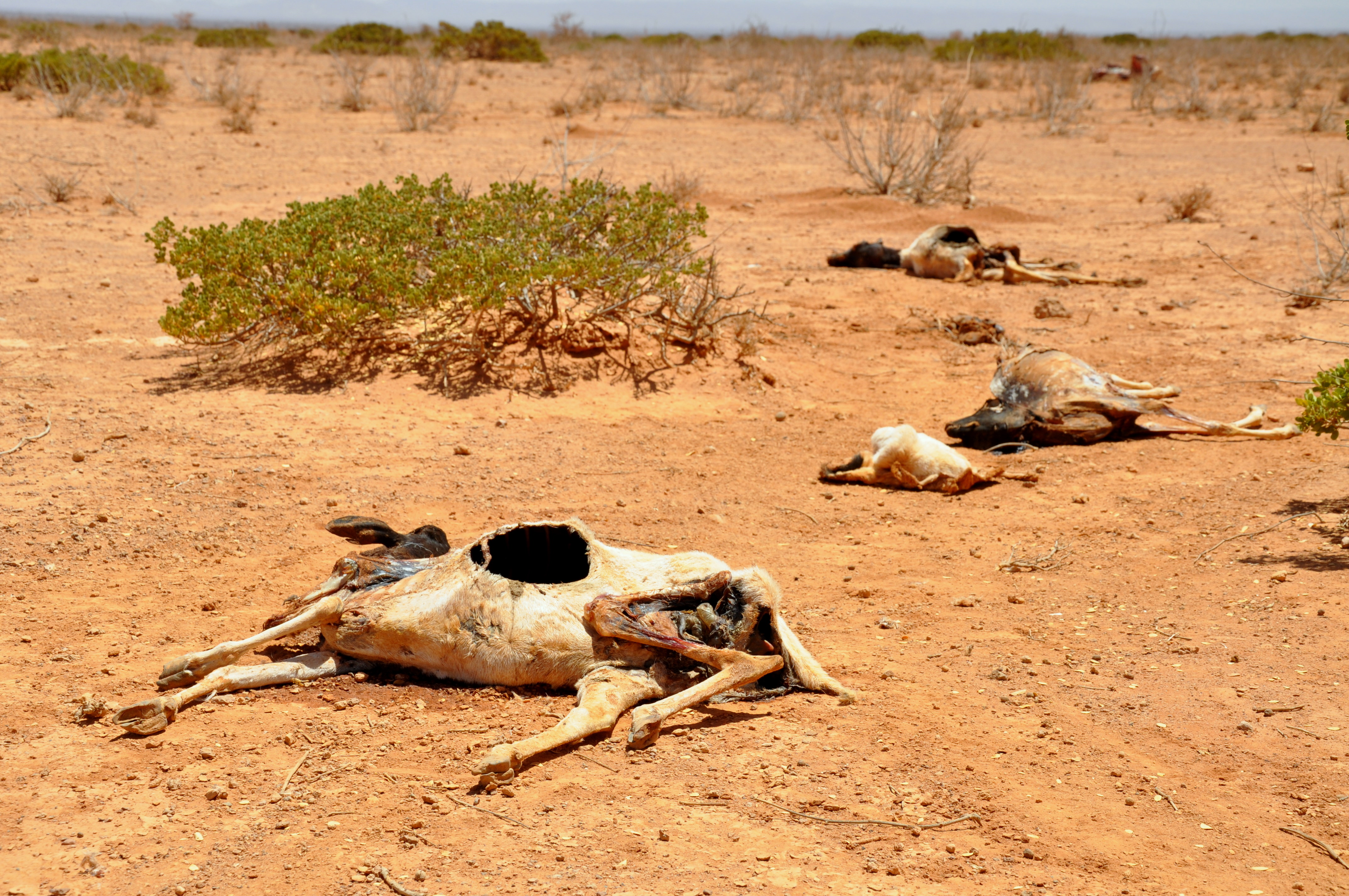
Carcasses of dead livestock stretch across the landscape.

=== Livestock responses ===
In Kenya, recurrent droughts can contribute to livestock disease. Consequently, more animal breeders chose to train in the field of livestock health. The increase in the number of trained and community-based health workers operating in the Turkana areas has enabled livestock keepers to acquire relevant skills through training and knowledge.

A tradition of the Kenyan rural culture is that local herbs and techniques are used in the treatment of livestock diseases. In recent years, with the emergence of trained community-based animal health workers, a safer and more advanced control is being opted for.

=== Responses assessment ===
The effectiveness of the drought intervention measures have been assessed in a range of studies. The main determinants which established the level of effectiveness of an intervention were whether the intervention was completed as planned and if they were able to deliver the intended benefits to the targeted beneficiaries.

Contributions from NGOs were generally considered more effective than those completed by the Kenyan government. Specifically, the contributions that made most of the difference and therefore top-ranked in the highest average effectiveness ratings, were funded by international donors. It was not possible to determine a relationship between the effectiveness of an intervention and the time at which it started.

On average, an intervention reached 3,227 individuals, increasing from 55 for peace-building to 22,370 for water trucking. The cost per individual reached was KSh. 3,362/= (approximately US$30.60 in 2021). This ranged from 163/= for water trucking to 8,652/= for emergency replenishment. This indicates that a total of more than 1.5 million people benefited, based on the presumption of no duplication (if the same person is benefiting from multiple interventions). The real relative impact that each intervention has had on the population is difficult to assess even though there is evidence to determine a better efficacy of one intervention. The reason is that there is inadequate information on the scale of the benefits given to individuals and households. In general, there was no relationship between an intervention's efficacy and the capital invested in its success.

== See also ==
- Kenya, climate section
- List of droughts
- Kenya water crisis
- Economy of Kenya
- Non-government organization
