= Susan Ngugi Nduyo =

Kenyan politician

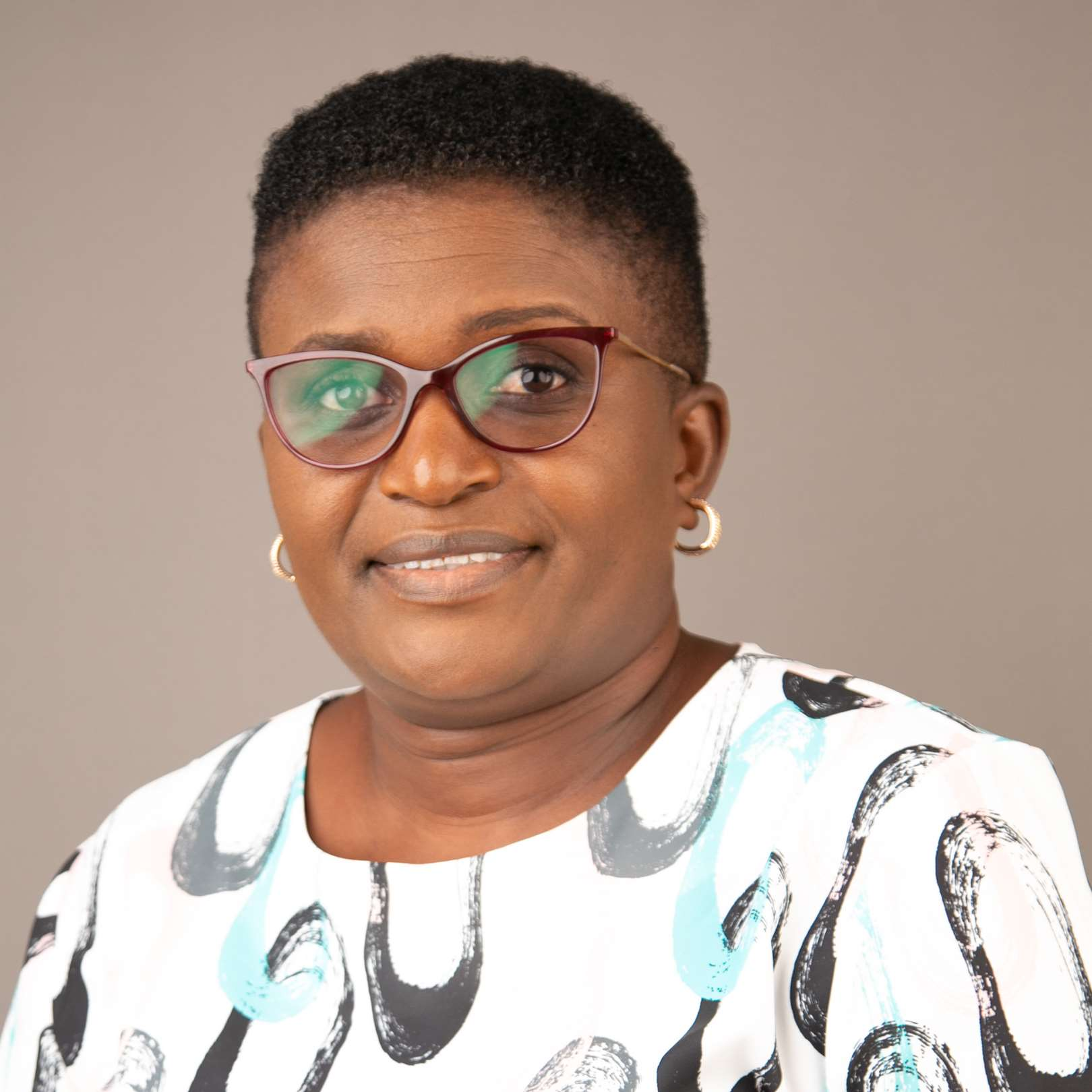
- Education: KCPE – Kamatungu Primary School (1989); KCSE – Ikuu Girls Secondary School (1993); Diploma in Occupational Therapy – Kenya Medical Training College (2001); Diploma in Project Management – Kenya Institute of Management (2009); BA in Psychology & Sociology – Kenyatta University (2009); MA in Sociology – Egerton University (2015)
- Alma mater: Kenya Medical Training College; Kenya Institute of Management; Kenyatta University; Egerton University
- Occupation: Politician
- Years active: 2009–present
- Organization: Susan Mwindu Rescue Services
- Known for: Women representation; advocacy against gender-based violence
- Office: Women Representative for Tharaka-Nithi County
- Political party: The Service Party

Susan Ngugi Nduyo is a Kenyan politician under The Service Party who was elected in 2022 as the Women Representative for Tharaka-Nithi County in Kenya.

== Education ==
Ngungi started her education at Kamatungu Primary School from 1981 to 1989, where she obtained her KCPE. She joined Ikuu Girls Secondary School between 1990 and 1993, where she got a B-minus grade from her KCSE.

She has a Diploma in Occupational Therapy got from the Kenya Medical Training College between 1998 and 2001, and a Diploma in Project Management from the Kenya Institute of Management (2008-2009). In 2009, she earned a Bachelor of Arts in Psychology and Sociology from Kenyatta University and a master's degree in Sociology from Egerton University in 2015.

== Career ==
Ngungi is the Women Representative for Tharaka-Nithi County in Kenya. She was a Project Director at MCK Thiti Child Development Centre in 2009 - 2010 and then briefly as a Children Officer with the Committee of Experts on Constitutional Review in 2010.

She served as the Children Officer under the Ministry of Gender, Children & Social Services from 2010 to 2014. She later joined the County Assembly of Tharaka-Nithi as Deputy Sub-County Administrator until 2017. From 2017 to 2022, she was the Deputy Speaker of the County Assembly after her election as MCA for Marimanti Ward. In August 2022, she opted to be the Women Representative for Tharaka-Nithi County under The Service Party.

Nduyo launched the Susan Nduyo Rescue Services initiative to help in the fight against female genital mutilation (FGM) and other forms of gender-based violence like defilement and intimate partner violence. She has also emphasised the healthy utilization of the National Government Affirmative Action Fund(NGAAF) which is intended to foster self empowering projects among her constituents and helping the needy students to meet their school fees obligations.

== See also ==
- The Service Party
