= Sara Korere =

Kenyan politician

Sara Paulata Korere is a Kenyan politician. She is the member of parliament for Laikipia North constituency.

== Early years and education ==
Korere was born in Laikipia. She had her primary education at Doldol Primary School and then proceeded to Doldol Secondary School and there, she had her secondary education. In 2000, she completed Egerton University with a diploma in agriculture education and extension.

== Career ==
Korere began working in 2001 at SARDEP, where she served as Community Mobilizer. From there she worked as Programme Officer for World Vision until 2004 when she left to work at the Electoral Commission of Kenya as the Deputy Coordinator of Laikipia County. Before her nomination as member of parliament to Kenya's National Assembly in 2013, she served as the Community Development Officer for Ol Pejeta Conservancy. In August 2017, she was sworn in as the member of parliament for Laikipia North constituency.

== Politics ==
In 2013, she was nominated as the member of parliament for Laikipia North constituency. She is known to have had a physical battle with the former Laikipia North Member of Parliament, Mathew Lempurkel after her nomination. She won the seat during the 2017 general elections and was sworn into office.

On 18 September 2017, she is known to have testified against Mathew Lempurkel for assaulting her on November 21, 2016.

She was re-elected in the 2022 Kenyan general election.
