= Reuben Kamuri =

Kenyan politician

Reuben Kamuri Ngatia

3rd Deputy Governor of Laikipia County
- Incumbent
- Assumed office 25th August 2022
- Preceded by: John Mwaniki

Personal details
- Party: UDA

Reuben Kamuri Ngatia is a Kenyan politician and biotechnologist, who is currently serving as the third deputy governor of Laikipia County. He was elected as the running mate of Joshua Irungu during the 2022 Kenyan general election. He holds a bachelor's degree in science from the Technical University of Kenya and a second degree from Kenyatta University in Biotechnology.
