= Dol Dol =

- Location within Kenya
- Coordinates: 0.4°N 37.17°E
- Country: Kenya
- County: Laikipia
- Time zone: UTC+3 (EAT)

Dol Dol is a village in the Laikipia North Sub County of Laikipia County in the Republic of Kenya. It is roughly 52 kilometeres due north of Nanyuki, and serves as the a market centre for the local residents. It is the largest urban settlement in Mukogodo East ward, and the wider Laikipia North Constituency, and thus has the area's largest open air market and sub county hospitals.

== Economy ==
Dol Dol is the hub where most of the local trading, that the local community who are primarily livestock herdsmen, takes place. This is similar to other urban settlements in Laikipia North, such as Naibor, and the larger urban settlements in Laikipia County: Nanyuki, Nyahururu, and Rumuruti. The village also sits in the midst of several nature conservancies, the creation of which has become a source of conflict between local pastoralists and conservancy management over access to pastures, and later sources.
