= Mwaniki =

Mwaniki is a surname. Notable people with the surname include:

- John Mwaniki, Kenyan politician
- Lydia Mwaniki, Kenyan Anglican priest
- Ruth Wangari Mwaniki (born 1963/64), Kenyan politician
