= Marmanet =

- Location within Kenya
- Country: Kenya
- County: Laikipia County
- Time zone: UTC+3 (EAT)

Marmanet is a town in Kenya's Laikipia County. It is situated approximately 15 km (9.3 mi) north of Nyahururu on the Nyahururu-Rumuruti Road., and is home to Marmanet Farmers Co-operative Society, which is one of the largest and oldest farmer's co-operatives in Kenya
