= Kenya Reform Party (disambiguation) =

Kenya Reform Party may refer to:

- Reform Party (Kenya) a colonial-era defunct political party
- Kenya Reform Party (Kenya) a reforms oriented political party headed by Ndiritu Muriithi
