= Taylor Harrison =

Taylor Harrison Gittin
- Also known as: LOR
- Born: November 5, 1990 (age 35); Los Angeles, California
- Genres: Electronic, Indie-Electronic, Breakbeat, Bass, Deep House, House, Electronic Rock, Indie Pop
- Occupations: Artist, Record Producer, Songwriter, Musician, Film Producer, Visual Artist
- Instruments: Ableton Live, Guitar, Bass, Drums, Synthesizer
- Labels: Anjunadeep, Distorsion Records, Electroshok Records, Elseware Records, LAIKIPIA Music
- Member of: LOR, LAIKIPIA

Taylor Harrison Gittin (born November 5, 1990) is an American record producer, songwriter, musician, and visual creator.

Born and raised in Los Angeles, California, he is best known as the sole member of the electronic music project LOR, and as co-founder of the indie-electronic duo LAIKIPIA.

== Career ==
In 2017, Harrison co-founded LAIKIPIA with British singer-songwriter Xander Rawlins. Their debut tracks were "Hello Dreamer" and "Down Down (feat. Thurz)".

In 2023, Harrison launched his solo project, LOR. His debut single was "Warpdrive".

== Discography ==
=== LAIKIPIA ===
- 2017: Hello Dreamer – (Single)
- 2017: Down Down (feat. Thurz) – (Single)
- 2017: Living Outside – (Single)
- 2017: I Know Love – (Single)
- 2018: You Are My Life – (Heartbeats & Echoes EP)
- 2018: Stay – (Heartbeats & Echoes EP)
- 2018: Hurricane – (Heartbeats & Echoes EP)
- 2018: Voodoo Woman – (Single)
- 2019: That Feeling – (Single)
- 2019: Let Go – (Single)
- 2019: Nothing But A Memory – (Single)
- 2020: Big Fish – (Single)
- 2020: Big Fish (Lukins Cinematic Version) – (Single)
- 2020: Big Fish (LOR Remix) – (Single)
- 2021: All Hail Hyperion – (All Hail Hyperion LP)
- 2021: The Hits Keep Coming – (All Hail Hyperion LP)
- 2021: Fly By – (All Hail Hyperion LP)
- 2021: Elephant Man – (All Hail Hyperion LP)
- 2021: The Silence – (All Hail Hyperion LP)
- 2021: My Queen – (All Hail Hyperion LP)
- 2021: Worship – (All Hail Hyperion LP)
- 2021: Painkiller (feat. Will and the People) – (All Hail Hyperion LP)
- 2021: Best Intentions – (All Hail Hyperion LP)
- 2021: Remember – (All Hail Hyperion LP)

=== LOR ===
- 2023: Warpdrive – (Single)
- 2023: To The Rhythm – (Single)
- 2023: Kingdom Falling – (Single)
- 2023: Daze – (Single)
- 2023: The Same Shit – (Single)
- 2024: Something Beautiful – (Single)
- 2024: Face of the Tortured – (Single)
- 2024: Let's Get Started – (Single)
- 2024: Gunship - Blood for the Blood God (feat. HEALTH) (LOR Remix) – (Single)
- 2024: Half There (feat. Dominique) – (Single)
