= Ndiritu Muriithi =

Kenyan politician

His Excellency Ndìritū Mūrììthi

Chairperson, Kenya Revenue Authority
- Incumbent
- Assumed office 3 January 2025
- Preceded by: Anthony Mwaura

Governor Laikipia County
- In office 2017 – 9 August 2022
- Preceded by: Joshua Irungu
- Succeeded by: Joshua Irungu

Member of Parliament Laikipia West Constituency
- In office 2 January 2008 – 2013
- Preceded by: GG Kariuki
- Succeeded by: Patrick Mariru

Assistant Minister for Industrialization
- In office 2 January 2008 – 2013

Personal details
- Born: 10 February 1967 (age 59)
- Party: PNU 2007-2013; PNU 2013-2017; Jubillee Party 2022-2026; Kenya Reform Party 2026 to present
- Spouse: Maria Mbeneka
- Education: St. Francis Xavier University(BSc Economics and Finance); University of Technology, Sydney MSc. Project Management
- Occupation: Economist

Ndìritū Mūrììthi is a Kenyan politician and former Governor of Laikipia County. He was elected in the August 2017 general elections as an Independent Candidate after he failed to clinch the Jubilee Alliance nominations ticket. He was elected as the second governor of Laikipia County through an independent ticket. He is currently the Chairperson of the Kenya Revenue Authority having been sworn in on 30 December 2024.

== Early life ==
He went to Shamanei Primary School then went to Kagumo High School and then the prestigious Alliance High School. In 1990 he graduated with a degree in economics and finance from St. Francis Xavier University in Canada. He attended the University of Technology, Sydney in 1994 and 1995 pursuing a master's degree in project management.

== Profession ==
Mūrììthi is an economist and financial markets expert with over 24 years’ experience in leadership and management in Kenya, South Africa, Canada and Australia. Mūrììthi has spearheaded numerous financial market strengthening initiatives across African countries covering establishment of credit sharing and scoring institutions, improved bond market function, expansion of mortgage markets, and even growth of women-owned enterprises. He was primarily involved in the design and implementation of these programs and contributed substantively to the development of financial markets that provide required services to many nations.

== Political career ==
Mūrììthi served as a Member of Parliament representing Laikipia West and assistant minister for industrialization between 2007 and 2013, in the government of Mwai Kibaki. He was involved in reforms to improve the environment for doing business, and improving incentives to promote investments. He was also involved in the development of policy and law related to finance and economics such as legislation governing establishment of credit bureau, interest rates, taxation and other fiscal measures. Scandal has dogged him over his handling of Ngarua Millers in Laikipia which collapsed during his term as an assistant minister. As a Governor attempts to revive it has led to conflict with the community with allegations of his attempts to privatize a co-operative. He has also faced criticism over privatization of a community slaughter house to family business.

Mūrììthi's tenure as governor has been dogged by a succession of legal battles. He additionally has experienced growth in regional influence since initiating the AMAYA Triangle Initiative, which seeks socio economic transformation of four pastoralist counties by pushing for adoption of feedlots and other modern technologies in livestock husbandry. Mūrììthi was instrumental in the drive to have the derelict Nairobi-Nanyuki and Gilgil-Nyahururu railway lines rehabilitated. He is the current finance, planning and economic affairs committee chairperson in the council of governors elected on 29/01/2021. Upon his election as Governor of Laikipia in 2017, Mūrììthi embarked on reforms of the county public service to make it professional and globally competitive. These efforts have been rewarded with unmatched growth of the county's own source revenue which has doubled since the 2016/2017 financial year. Mūrììthi is also credited with following through with the Smart Towns Initiative funded by the World Bank's Global Smart City Partnership Program (GSCP). in Key Laikipia towns. He also focused the county public service on enterprise development to bridge the gap between development and positive social change. Under his leadership, a number of local Small and Medium Enterprises underwent incubation under the Laikipia Innovation and Enterprise development Programme which he started in 2018 to nurture the SMEs to become manufacturers through increased production.

Mūrììthi lost the Laikipia governorship to Joshua Irūngū in the Kenya 2022 general election.

== Family ==
Mūrììthi, who is former president Kibaki's nephew, is married to Maria Mbeneka, a lawyer.
