= Dixon Kihika Kimani =

Kenyan politician (1930–2004)

Member of Parliament Molo Constituency
- In office 1997–2002
- Preceded by: John Njenga Muigai
- Succeeded by: Macharia Mukiri

Member of Parliament Laikipia West Constituency
- In office 1992–1997
- Preceded by: Danson Ndumia Murukia
- Succeeded by: Chege Mbitiru

Member of Parliament Nakuru North Constituency
- In office 1974–1979
- Preceded by: Muhia Babu Wood
- Succeeded by: Koigi wa Wamwere

Personal details
- Born: Dickson Kihika Kimani; 1930 British Kenya
- Died: 2004 (aged 73–74)
- Party: Kenya African National Union; DP
- Spouse(s): Nyambura Kihika; Lucy Wangari; Jane Wanjiru; Miriam Warau; Charity Nyambura; Margaret Wambui; Winnie Wanjeri; Alice Kihika
- Children: 41
- Occupation: Businessman

Hon Dickson Kihika Kimani(1930–2004) was a Kikuyu politician and businessman who served in three different parliamentary constituencies, and was a leading member of the GEMA Association. Within that organisation, he was one of the leading advocates for a move to alter Kenya's constitution at the time to prevent then Vice President Daniel Moi from succeeding President Jomo Kenyatta, in the event that the latter died. He was first elected to parliament representing Nakuru North Constituency in 1974, where he served for a single term before he lost the seat to Koigi wa Wamwere. In the 1992 general election, with the return of Multiparty democracy in Kenya, he was elected Member of Parliament for Laikipia West Constituency, and then for the subsequent 1997 general election, he changed seats and was successfully elected Member of parliament for Molo Constituency . He died in 2004 due to complications related to diabetes. He is the father of Nakuru County Governor Susan Kihika.
