= Water conflict between Ethiopia and Kenya =

The water conflict between Ethiopia and Kenya is a development dispute due to the receding water resource along the border between Ethiopia and Kenya.

== Overview ==
Ethiopia decided to build the Gilgel Gibe III Dam on the Omo River to provide hydropower electricity to Ethiopia as well as Egypt, Sudan, Djibouti, Kenya, Uganda and Yemen. Considering rising temperatures, desertification and because the Omo is the main water source for several Ethiopian and Kenyan tribes, the dam could potentially cause violent conflict. Professor Aaron Wolf identified the problem's two major factors as:economic and population growth, and institutional capacity, or "human systems built to mitigate the change".

In the border area between Ethiopia and Kenya, The Turkana of Kenya and the Dassanech, Nyangatom and Mursi of Ethiopia are tribes that depend on the Omo River and Lake Turkana to survive. In the past years the area became drier, with a hot climate and prolonged drought. Population growth aggravated the problem. The people live in a pastoral system, moving around wherever resources can be found. In years of scarcity conflicts happen almost every day.

Lake Turkana receives 90 percent of its water from Omo River. Rising temperatures and reduced rainfall have contributed to the lake's retreat into Kenya. To survive, the Ethiopians tribes began following the water. As a result, intertribal conflict is increasing.

As of 2005, at least four Ethiopians and 20 Kenyans had died, although some Kenyan government officials placed the toll as high as 69, according to the Kenya-based Daily Nation. The localized fighting pressured both nations to address the conflict.

According to John Nunyes, a member of Kenya's parliament, Ethiopians had moved 15 km (9.3 mi) inside Kenya. "They have stopped our Turkana people from fishing, they have thrown us out of the pastures, we can't access the waters. We allowed our communities to continue fighting and competing over resources", he said.

In 2011, an estimated 900 armed militia and 2,500 Ethiopian civilians on Kenyan territory around lake Turkana increased attacks against Kenyans. The Kenyan government claimed that these illegal immigrants had taken control of 10 Kenyan villages and vowed to send them back to Ethiopia.

The dispute was driven both by territorial claims and access to water resources.

== Tribes ==
=== Turkana people ===
The Turkana are frequently attacked by the Ethiopian tribes. In May 2011, a dozen Ethiopians allegedly killed Kenya's head of the Border Police, John Nunyes, a Kenyan Parliament member who visited the Turkana community. Before dramatic climate changes, the area inhabited by the Turkana people enabled the sustainability of livestock herds. This was because of the area's predictable rainfall and availability of land. Many people are now migrating toward the Turkana's territory and most Turkana tribesmen are suffering from the loss of pasture and access to water.

=== Daasanach people ===
The Daasanach share a traditional border with the Turkana. However, the border is moving toward south because of receding water. According to the Christian Science Monitor, the Daasanach have begun cultivating the land and fishing using the waters of the River Omo-Lake Turkana Delta in competition with the Kenyan Turkana people for both land and water resources.

=== Nyangatom people ===
The Nayangatom are cattle herders who use Omo River water for their animals. Those who are displaced internally rely on government and foreign support, which is not always well thought out. For example, the international community sent foods such as maize, which cannot be eaten raw and requires a lot of water to cook.

== Incidents ==
Date	Location	Description
2000	Ethiopia	One man stabbed to death during fight over clean water during famine in Ethiopia.
2000	Kenya	A clash between villagers and thirsty monkeys left eight apes dead and ten villagers injured. The duel started after water tankers brought water to a drought-stricken area and desperate monkeys attacked the villagers.
2004-2006	Ethiopia	At least 250 people were killed and many more injured in clashes over water wells and pastoral lands. Villagers call it the "War of the Well" and describe "well warlords, well widows, and well warriors." A three-year drought has led to extensive violence over limited water resources, worsened by the lack of effective government and central planning.
2005	Kenya	Police were sent to the northwestern part of Kenya to control a major violent dispute between Kikuyu and Maasai groups over water. More than 20 people were killed in fighting in January. By July, the death toll exceeded 90, principally in the rural center of Turbi. The tensions arose over grazing and water. Maasai herdsmen accused a local Kikuyu politician of diverting a river to irrigate his farm, depriving downstream livestock. Fighting displaced more than 2000 villagers and reflects tensions between nomadic and settled communities.
2006	Ethiopia	At least 12 people died and over 20 were wounded in clashes over competition for water and pasture in the Somali border region.
2006	Ethiopia and Kenya	At least 40 people died in continuing clashes over water, livestock, and grazing land. Fighting occurred in the region of Oromo and the Marsabit district.
2011	Ethiopia and Kenya	Kenyan President Mwai Kibaki and former Ethiopian Prime Minister Meles Zenawi's May 2011 met in Uganda, where they decided to end border conflicts amicably.
2012-2013	Kenya	Extensive violence over water was reported in Kenya with more than 100 deaths in clashes between farmers and cattle herders. This conflict is part of a long-running dispute between Pokomo farmers and Orma semi-nomadic cattle herders. The current conflict is being exacerbated by Kenyan and foreign investment in food and biofuel cultivation, putting pressure on local resources.
2012	Kenya	Related violence, including several deaths, occurred in disputes over access to water in the poorest slums around Nairobi, Kenya.

== See also ==
- Kenya water crisis
