= Chris Kiptoo =

Kenyan politician

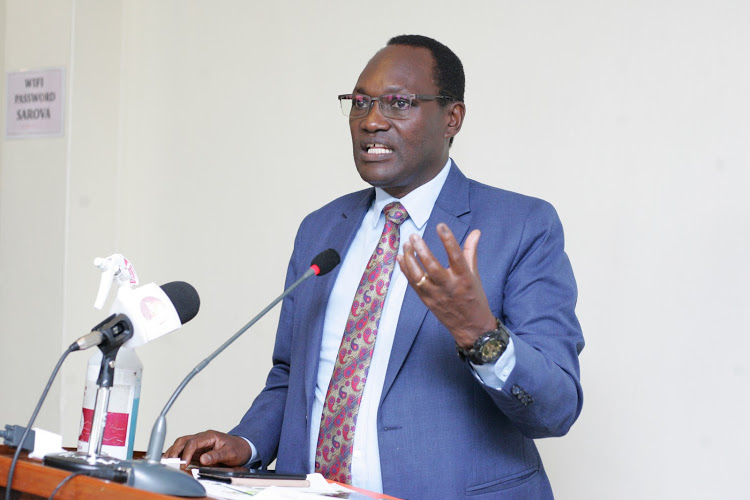

Principal Secretary (PS) the National Treasury
- Incumbent
- Assumed office 4 December 2022
- President: William Ruto

Principal Secretary (PS) for the Ministry of Environment and Forestry
- In office 1 December 2015 – 14 January 2020
- President: Uhuru Kenyatta
- Preceded by: Betty Maina

Principal Secretary, State Department for Trade in the Ministry of Industry, Trade and Cooperatives.
- President: Uhuru Kenyatta

Personal details
- Born: 31 December 1967 (age 58) Elgeyo-Marakwet County
- Children: 3
- Education: St. Patrick's High School (Iten, Kenya), Egerton University, University of Nairobi

Chris Kiptoo (born 31 December 1967) is a Principal Secretary (PS) for National Treasury in Kenya. He assumed office on 4 December 2022, following reassignment by H.E. President wiliam ruto . He has also had a career spanning 15 years at the Central Bank of Kenya (CBK) as a manager during which he was seconded to the International Monetary Fund (IMF), the Capital Markets Authority of Kenya (CMA) as Senior advisor and manager special projects, and to the Office of the Prime Minister (OPM) Kenya as economic adviser to the prime minister, then Raila Odinga. Kiptoo also had a short stint at National Cereals and Produce Board (NCPB).

== Principal Secretary (PS) for the National Treasury ==
Kiptoo is one of the selected 51 Principal Secretaries in Kenya who were appointed by H.E President William Ruto as soon as he assumed office following the 2022 general elections in Kenya. After a thorough vetting of all the shortlisted candidates in the PS position, he was on 1 December 2022 sworn in as the Principal Secretary, National Treasury of Kenya. The swearing in ceremony was presided over by President William Ruto at State house-Nairobi.

== Principal Secretary (PS) for the Ministry of Environment and Forestry ==
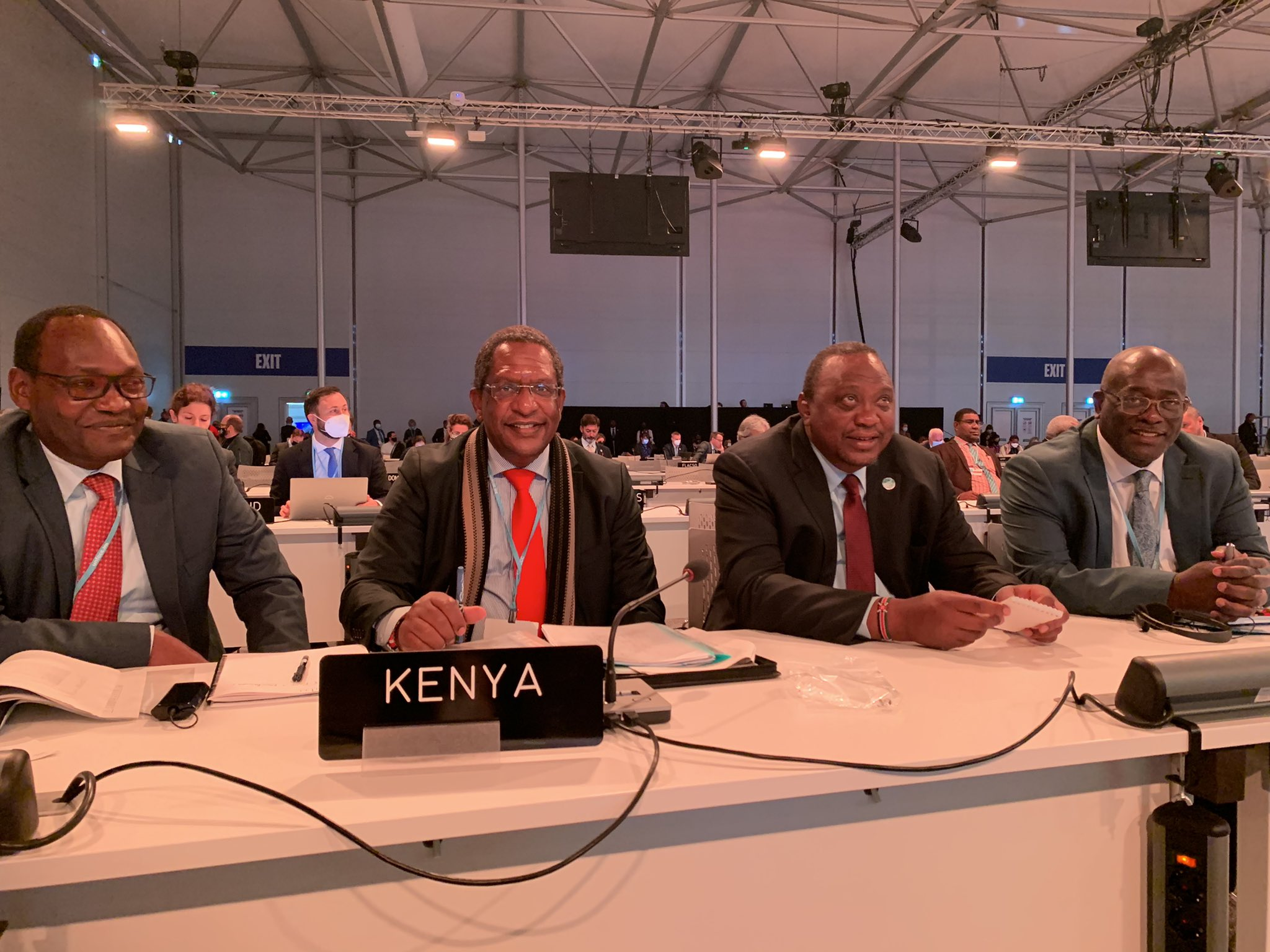
Kiptoo attending 2021 United Nations Climate Change Conference with Keriako Tobiko and Uhuru Kenyatta

Kiptoo joined the Ministry of Environment and Forestry as Permanent Secretary in January 2020. Through the Global Environment Facility, where he serves as the Focal Point for Kenya, Kiptoo has initiated and facilitated several programs. Kiptoo facilitated the renewed management of Michuki Park and the handing over to the Kenya Forest Service (KFS). He helped develop plans for rehabilitation and restoration of Cherangany-Elgeiyo Hill Ecosystem, Tsavo Ecosystem, Joint Programming for conservation of Southern Kenya Northern Tanzania (SOKNOT) transboundary landscape.

Kiptoo was key in development of the four key elements for implementation of REDD+ process as a key vehicle for delivery of national climate change goals. These elements include the REDD+ Strategy, Safeguard Information System, Forest Reference Level and the National forest monitoring system. These elements, currently under implementation and additional improvements will support country's access to climate finance to support sustainable forest management and conservation efforts

Kiptoo helped mobilize stakeholder engagement and participation for the successful implementation of the presidential Directive on accelerated achievement and maintenance of over 10% forest cover by 2022. He led the conceptualization and development of the tree growing and Sustainable Forest Financing Program for mobilizing global and local finance from public and private sources to support forest sector development. He has been active in strengthening the policy and legislative environment for forest sector development, through which KEFRI has been strengthened as the premier institution for tree production, processing and distribution. KEFRI's capacity of seed production has been raised from 60 metric tons to 300 metric tons with an annual capacity to produce 3 billion seedlings.

Kiptoo advocated for the finalization of the National Sustainable Waste management policy and Kenya Meteorological Bill seeking to make KMD a Semi-Autonomous Government Agency (SAGA).

== Principal Secretary (PS) for the State Department of Trade in the Ministry of Industry, Trade, and Co-operatives ==
Kiptoo also coordinated the process of establishing the Kenya Commodities Exchange (KOMEX) whose aim is to address challenges faced by farmers/producers due to inefficiencies mainly brought about by lack of a transparent and efficient marketplace where producers are exploited by middlemen.

Kiptoo facilitated provision of training of Micro, Small and Medium-sized Enterprises (MSMEs), operators and other interest groups in areas like business planning, entrepreneurship, record keeping, sourcing for business finance, marketing, costing, and pricing of products among others and implemented Trade Training Program for SME Exporters. He engaged United Nations Conference on Trade and Development for the establishment of EMPRETEC Centre, a flagship capacity-building programme for MSMEs to facilitate sustainable development and inclusive growth.

On 23 May 2024, Kiptoo was among the guests invited to the state dinner hosted by U.S. President Joe Biden in honor of President William Ruto at the White House.

== Rural community work ==
Kiptoo is the current patron of Kaptagat Integrated Conservation Programme which is key in rehabilitation and restoration of degraded forest areas.

Chris kiptoo attended the 6th edition of the Annual Kaptagat Tree Planting in Kaptagat Forest, where he encouraged locals and stakeholders to keep up the good work and continue with the support for forest restoration.

== Education ==
Kiptoo took his A-levels at St. Patrick's High School, studied economics at Egerton University, and later acquired a master's degree from Egerton. He holds a Doctor of Philosophy degree (PhD) in International Macroeconomics, Finance Specialization from the University of Nairobi.

== Publications ==
- "Integrated National Export Development and Promotion Strategy Plus Implementation Plan"
- "Real exchange rate volatility and misalignment: effects on trade and investment in Kenya"
- "The potential impact of the global financial crisis on African economies"
