= Water scarcity in Kenya =

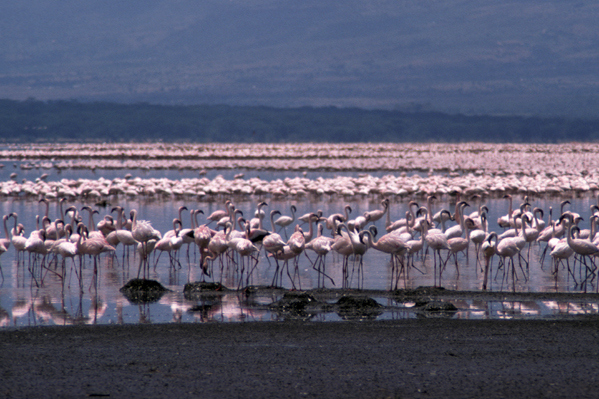
Flamingos on Lake Bogoria

Water scarcity in Kenya is affecting the Kenyan population who relies on water resources, not only for drinking but also for agriculture and fishing. For example, wetland grasses are used to feed and keep livestock. Human populations throughout Kenya have been affected by a lack of clean drinking water due in large part to the overuse of land and increases in community settlements. A specific example of this is in the Mau Forest, in the highlands of Kenya, that is a major watershed for the country. In the Mau Complex, individuals have used land for their personal gain, creating homes and farms at the expense of the natural biodiversity.

The destruction of trees throughout the forest has caused severe soil erosion, which pollutes the water. This phenomenon exists all over the country and with the addition of animal and human waste into already polluted water, it has made finding clean water generally more difficult for Kenyan citizens. The current water conditions have caused a number of issues including many diseases and tribal conflicts over the remaining water resources.

Video of children in rural Kenya carrying water from the river

Additionally, as clean water becomes harder to find, women are forced to walk for many miles each day to find the water needed for the family. Another huge problem with clean water in Kenya has been an influx of individuals moving to large cities such as Nairobi, which creates large slum areas that have some of the worst living conditions and most polluted water in the country. This interaction between humans and water is currently at a crucial point in Kenya as the nation faces a major shortage in the ability for citizens to receive the water they so desperately need. Significant improvements in land management and environmental policies can help make sure that this country has the water it needs on its way to becoming a developed country.

== Population growth ==
Understanding Kenya's environmental situation requires looking not only at the environment but also at social, economic, and political factors that play an important factor in a still-developing country. With a quickly expanding population, sustaining the environment and sustaining the growing population is a challenge. The population continues to increase while the economy and resources struggle to keep up. Kenya's population faces high rates of poverty, up to 43% in 2000.

In a population that relies heavily on agriculture as a way of life, it is difficult to limit agriculture and protect the environment without taking away a resource many people in this growing population need to survive. The quickly growing population puts pressure on water resources through agriculture, land and energy uses as well as other factors. The geographic location of water resources in Kenya is also a key factor. Water is not distributed equally throughout the country, leaving large places of drylands. About 80% of Kenya's water resources are completely unprotected but not undamaged by the growing population and agricultural practices.

== Wildlife ==
Kenya's water systems are recognised internationally for their importance to species diversity and bird migration. Water issues directly affect wildlife, since the availability of drinking water is a necessity for survival. Wildlife is also indirectly affected by the human population's use of water to support livestock and agriculture, which compete with wildlife for limited water resources. Kenya is known for its species diversity and richness; it is in the top 50 countries of species richness. It also has one of the highest percentages of threatened mammal species.

== Impact of deforestation on water resources ==
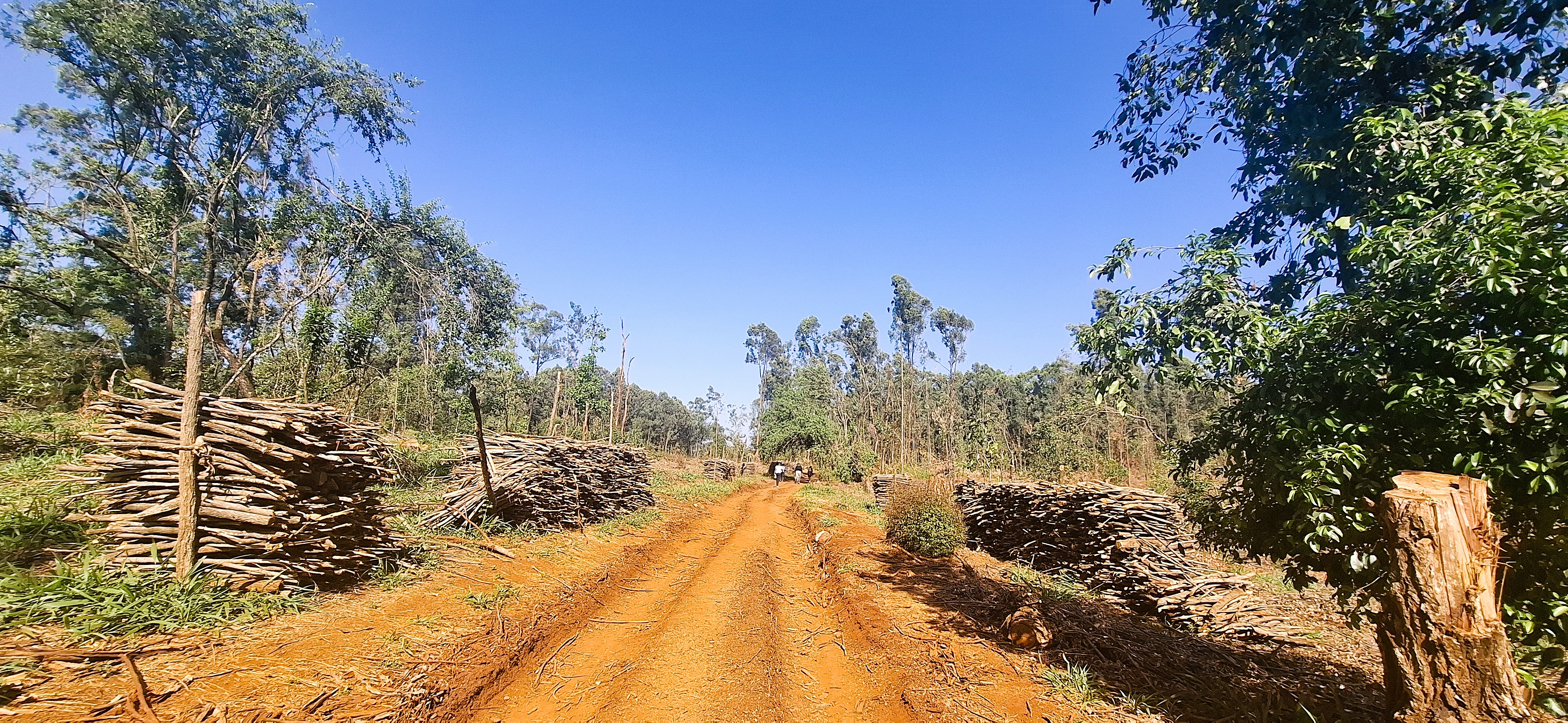
Tree cutting in Karura forest-Nairobi Kenya

Forests are important in protecting water catchment areas. When large areas of forest are logged, ecosystem services such as water supply may be negatively affected. Kenya has one of the most diverse forests in East Africa. but these forests are threatened because they are heavily used as a source of fuel or converted to agricultural land. Logging for fuel is one of the main reasons forests are threatened. Out of 22 million tons of wood products used in Kenya, 20 million are used for fuel.

Large areas will continue to be deforested if current logging rates and population growth do not decrease. An additional problem when land is deforested for agriculture is that forests often grow on poor soils that are unsuitable for agriculture. Therefore, farmers continue deforesting new areas when soil nutrients become too scarce to support crop-farming.

There is a great deal of activism surrounding water resources in Kenya. The communities that are affected by these water issues have many solutions to these problems. There are also many organisations that aid these communities. However, this has not solved the problem. There are simultaneously many forces that work against the solution to the water problem in Kenya. There are several organisations that work towards helping cope and solve the water problem in Kenya. Quest4Change, waterWater.org, WaterRelief are examples of such organisations. Through their work, they have provided clean water to many people who need it. Building wells is one thing that these organisations often do. Though the actual production of the well only takes a few days, the planning takes a few months. It is found that when communities request help building a well, these communities are more successful in maintaining their water supply than communities that are approached and just given a well.

A water committee is elected to guide the well-building process. Many materials such as stones need to be hauled to the site. Geological surveys show if there is a good site. The hole is drilled and once water is hit, a pump is installed and a cement cap put in place.

This allows people in Kenya to have a safe, accessible water source. These organisations also build small dams for communities. This allows communities to have water sources in times of droughts and gives them more reliable access to and consumption of clean water.

Education is another important aspect of these organisations. They teach people the importance of having clean water and proper sanitation to prevent disease and increase health.

== Mau Forest ==
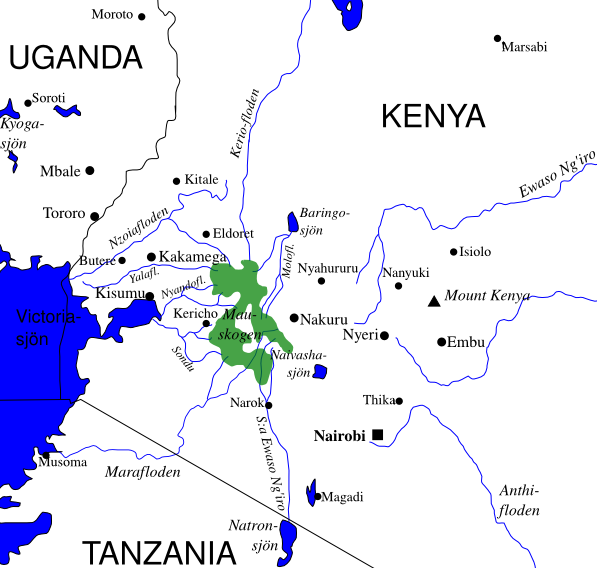
Map of the Mau Forest indicated by the green colour

The Mau Forest has lost a fourth of its original cover since the 1980s. The Ogiek people have traditionally occupied the forest. They maintain a hunter-gatherer lifestyle that is very sustainable. There has been an increase in the population in the forest. Much of the growth has been due to immigration. This new population has cleared forest land and lead less sustainable lifestyles.

The land is now being used for housing and industrial purposes. This urban encroachment has led to excessive use of the river waters. The drying up of these rivers is very concerning. Many communities use these rivers downstream of the headwaters. Since these rivers are being threatened at their source, they are not providing as much water for the many people that need it further downriver. It also threatens many other natural aspects of the forest. The rivers are important for river flow regulation, flood mitigation, water storage, reduced soil erosion, biodiversity, carbon sequestration, carbon reservoirs and microclimate regulation.

There have been community movements to save and restore the state of this forest. However, some approaches to restoring the forest may displace a little less than 2,000 people who hold land deeds in the forest. There are other efforts to help the people living in the forest do so in a more ecologically friendly way. The Greenbelt movement pays people to plant trees. This is an incentive, but the outcome still seems bleak, as these tribes are more interested in their own well-being than that of people miles down the river.

== Government in Kenya's water crisis ==
Kenya's government does not have the funds to maintain strong piping systems. More than half of Kenya's population does not have regular access to piped water, and for those that do the water is often dangerously unsanitary thanks to poorly constructed systems suffering from malfunctions and vandalism.

A number of acts and reforms have been put into motion to aid Kenya's situation, but the country still suffers from a water crisis worse than almost any other in the world. In 1974, the government launched the National Water Master Plan, with the goal of having drinkable and available water within walking distance of every household by the year 2000. Due to a conflict between urban areas that have undergone water privatisation and rural areas where investors have been advised against developing, the funds have not been supplied to make this happen.

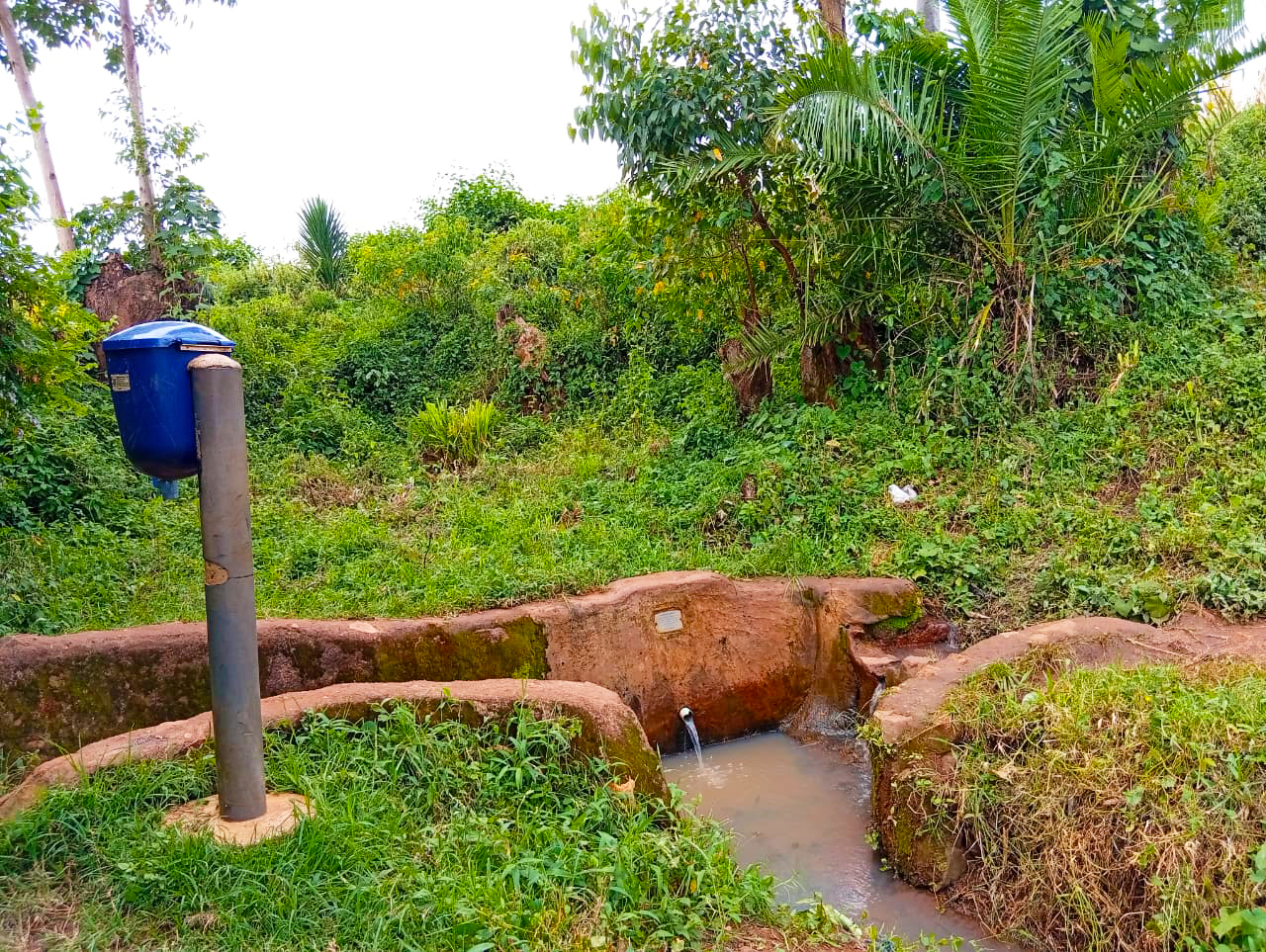
Water point - Kegonche village-Kuria East Sub County in Migori County, Kenya

Some corporations have seen a fair amount of success from their efforts to contribute to a healthier water supply. The National Water Conservation and Pipeline Corporation has offered a great deal of aid since its establishment in June 1988. The organisation works to develop dams and dykes, manage flood control, and help with land drainage. They also work for the conservation and sustainability of water throughout the year and the re-use of ground and flood water.

Groups operating outside of Kenya have been pitching in as well. Since 1997 the Danish Refugee Council has been providing relief services and contributing to the development of sanitary water systems throughout Kenya and other parts of East Africa.

Millions in Kenya have also had water supply systems built by volunteer organisations and self-help groups, usually with funding from donations and support from the Department of Water Development. Still, the country suffers, as do those who share its water sources. Over a dozen countries share basins with Kenya, and at this point there has been no international framework to organise the management of these shared water resources.

== See also ==
- Water conflict between Ethiopia and Kenya
- Water supply and sanitation in Kenya
- Thomson's Falls
- Water scarcity
- 2008–2009 Kenya drought
