= Mercy Chebeni =

Kenyan accountant and politician (born 1992)

- Born: 21 December 1992 (age 33); Kenya
- Education: Egerton University, BA, Economics and Sociology; St. Paul's University, MA, Development Studies
- Occupations: Accountant; politician
- Years active: 2017–present
- Political party: Orange Democratic Movement

Mercy Chebeni (born 21 December 1992) is a Kenyan accountant and politician who is a member of the Orange Democratic Movement party. She was the youngest ever to be nominated as a senator on 31 August 2017 at 24 years.

== Early life and education ==
Chebeni holds a Masters of Development Studies from St.Paul's University, Bachelor of Arts in Economics and Sociology from Egerton University- Rift Valley, Kenya as well as the Certified Public Accountant from Liit College - Limuru.

== Career ==
Chebeni was nominated by the ODM party as Senator to represent the youth and gender affairs in the senate. She worked as an accountant at Cornerstone Educational Complex, Uasin Gishu County Government and Oensey Tours and travel from January 2016, April 2016 and February 2017 respectively.

== See also ==
- Senate of Kenya
