= Kenya Reform Party =

- Abbreviation: KRP
- Leader: Ndiritu Muriithi
- Chairman: Lawrence Munene Kihiro
- Secretary-General: Dixon Mwanyangwa
- Organising Secretary: Lillian Mukiri
- Treasurer: Maureen Oresia
- Women League Leader: Zeinab Wario
- PWD League Leader: Julius Sulianka
- Founded: 2016
- Headquarters: 34, Rossylin Riviera, Limuru Road, Nairobi, Kenya
- Colors: Gold, red, green, white, black

Website
- https://ref.ke/index.html

The Kenya Reform Party is a Kenyan political party organised around the values of creating employment, industrialisation, and security, as gears for enhancing development. The Independent Electoral and Boundaries Commission fully registered it as a political party on 22 February 2016. It was adopted by Ndiritu Muriithi as part of his bi to secure re-election as governor of Laikipia County in the Kenyan general election of 2027.
