= Godfrey Gitahi Kariuki =

Kenyan politician

Godfrey Gìtahi Kariūki

Member of the Kenyan Senate
- In office 28 March 2013 – 30 June 2017
- Constituency: Laikipia County

Member of the Kenyan National Assembly
- In office 2003–2007
- President: Mwai Kibaki
- Preceded by: F. Chege Mbitiru
- Succeeded by: Ndiritu Muriithi
- Constituency: Laikipia West

Personal details
- Born: 1 January 1937 Kenya Colony
- Died: 30 June 2017 (aged 80) Nairobi
- Party: TNA
- Education: Salve Regina University
- Occupation: Politician

Godfrey Gìtahi Kariūki, known as GG Kariūki (1 January 1937 – 30 June 2017) was a Kenyan politician who entered elective politics at independence in 1963. During Kenya's 11th Parliament, he served as Senator representing Laikipia County and one of the only politicians to serve the four presidents of Kenya, from 2013 until his death on 30 Jun 2017. Previously he had served several terms as Member of Parliament for Laikipia West Constituency, and he was Minister in both the governments of Jomo Kenyatta and Daniel arap Moi.

He wrote an autobiography detailing his political career titled Illusion of Power: Fifty Years in Kenya Politics. In May 2009 he was arraigned in court for allegedly threatening to bring together various militia gangs in an attempt to overthrow the government. He was elected as Senator for Laikipia County in the 2013 general elections. He died on 29 June 2017 at the age of 78 at a Nairobi Hospital.
