= Joseph Nguthiru =

Kenyan climate engineer

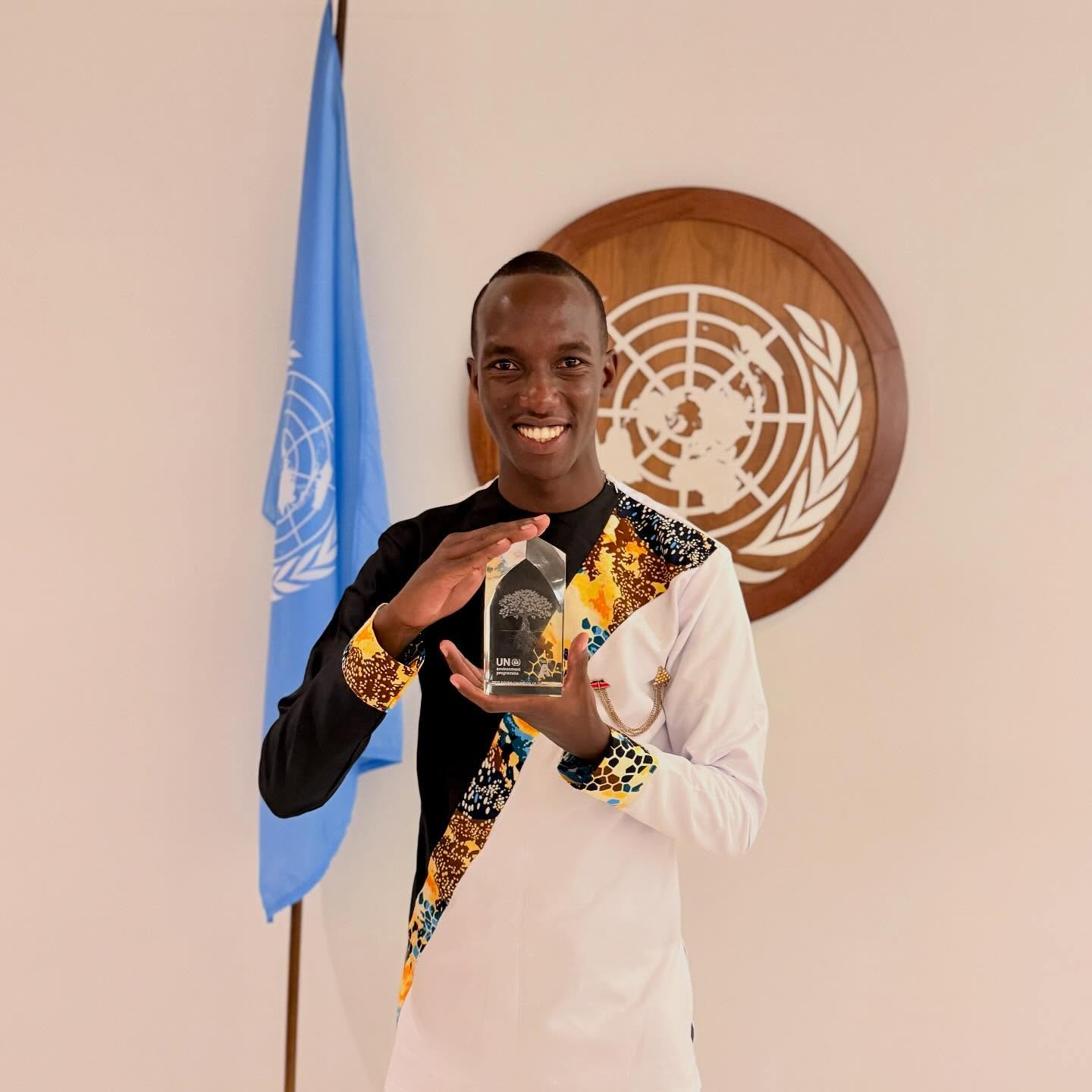
- Nguthiru with the UN Young Champions of the Earth Award at the United Nations General Assembly in New York (2025)
- Born: Nairobi, Kenya
- Education: Egerton University (BSc Civil and Environmental Engineering)
- Occupations: Environmental innovator, social entrepreneur, engineer
- Known for: Environmental innovation, circular economy solutions. Founder of HyaPak, M-Situ AI, AfroClimate
- Awards: UN Young Champion of the Earth; Obama Foundation Leader; 40 Under 40 Africa; Prototypes for Humanity Award - COP28
- Website: josephnguthiru.com

Joseph Nguthiru is a Kenyan climate-tech engineer, environmental innovator, and social entrepreneur recognized for his work in sustainable technology and circular economy solutions. He founded HyaPak, a startup that converts water hyacinth, an invasive aquatic weed, into biodegradable alternatives to single-use plastics.

Nguthiru's innovations have gained international recognition: he is a 2025 United Nations Environment Programme (UNEP) Young Champion of the Earth, an Obama Foundation Leader (2023), a recipient of the Prototypes for Humanity Award at COP28, a One Young World Ambassador and part of 40 Under 40 Africa.

His ventures extend to M-Situ (AI-based forest protection), AfroClimate (climate entrepreneurship support), and the Adopt a River Initiative (river restoration).

== Early life and education ==
Nguthiru was born in Nairobi, Kenya. He attended Alliance High School, one of Kenya's leading secondary schools, before joining Egerton University in 2016 to study civil and environmental engineering.

During his university years, he developed a keen interest in sustainable technologies to address climate change and environmental degradation. His final-year project came after an ordeal of being stuck in Lake Naivasha during a class trip and focused on converting invasive water hyacinth into biodegradable packaging materials. This later became the foundation for HyaPak as the project evolved into a social enterprise following his graduation.

== Career and innovations ==
=== HyaPak ===
In 2022, Nguthiru founded HyaPak (HyaPak Ecotech Limited), a circular economy startup that transforms water hyacinth harvested from Lake Naivasha and other Kenyan water bodies such as Lake Victoria into biodegradable plastic products for packaging. Water hyacinth is classified as one of the world's most widespread invasive species by the Intergovernmental Platform on Biodiversity and Ecosystem Services (IPBES).

The plant blocks waterways, depletes oxygen in water bodies, and threatens aquatic ecosystems and local fishing industries. By 2025, HyaPak had removed over 8 hectares of water hyacinth from Lake Naivasha, helping restore the lake's ecological balance while simultaneously creating employment opportunities for local communities involved in harvesting and processing.

The company's product line includes packaging bags for courier services and biodegradable tree seedling bags that can be planted directly into the soil along with the seedling, eliminating plastic waste in reforestation projects.

The technology received significant international recognition at COP28 in Dubai, UAE, where HyaPak won the Prototypes for Humanity Award (2023) in the Nature, Food, and Water Systems category. The award was granted from a competitive pool of 2,800 submissions representing 710 universities across more than 200 research fields. HyaPak is also listed among the top 30 startups in Africa (2023) by the Yale Africa Startup Review.

In 2025, Nguthiru and HyaPak were featured by the United Nations Department of Economic and Social Affairs as one of the key projects at the 10th Multi-stakeholder Forum on Science, Technology and Innovation for the Sustainable Development Goals (SDGs).

=== Other ventures ===
Nguthiru co-founded M-Situ AI, a technology startup that uses artificial intelligence and satellite imagery as an early warning system to detect deforestation, wildfires, and illegal charcoal burning in Kenyan forests. The system aims to support forest conservation efforts by providing real-time alerts to relevant authorities.

He also serves as co-founder and engineer at AfroClimate, a registered 501(c)(3) non-profit organization that works to empower African entrepreneurs and innovators to develop solutions for climate change challenges.

Nguthiru developed a solar dryer technology used to revive pyrethrum plant farming in Kenya by improving the crop's post-harvest processing and reducing moisture content more efficiently.

In scientific youth engagement, Nguthiru co-founded The Keeling Society, a youth-led organization focused on climate science communication. He served as a Contact Point at the Science Working Group in YOUNGO (the official youth constituency of the United Nations Framework Convention on Climate Change - UNFCCC), where he represents young scientists in international climate negotiations.

=== Adopt a River Initiative ===
Through the Adopt a River initiative, Nguthiru has led environmental projects that have removed over three tons of waste from polluted rivers across Kenya. The initiative combines river cleanup activities with community environmental education, capacity building, and long-term river restoration strategies.

== Personal philosophy and values ==
Nguthiru emphasizes values-led leadership grounded in stewardship, equity, and scientific rigor. He advocates for locally appropriate, circular-economy solutions that turn environmental liabilities into livelihoods, and for youth-centered climate action that pairs innovation with accountability to affected communities. His philosophy blends systems thinking with practical engineering, favoring open collaboration across academia, government, and industry to accelerate just, measurable climate impact.

== Awards and recognition ==
- 2025 UN Young Champion of the Earth – United Nations Environment Programme (UNEP), presented at the United Nations General Assembly (UNGA)
- Obama Foundation Africa Leader (2023) – Selected as part of the Obama Foundation Leaders program
- 40 Under 40 Africa – Continental recognition for young African leaders (2024)
- Presidential Award for Best Innovator in Kenya – East Africa Science and Technology Commission (2022)
- Best Manufacturing Startup – Kenya Innovation Week (2022/2023)
- Prototypes for Humanity Award – COP28, Nature, Food, and Water Systems category (2023)
- Young Climate Prize – The World Around / Meta Top 25 Under 25
- Chinese Bridge – Vocal Category winner (2020)
- WFEO/UNESCO Award – World Engineering Day Hackathon Winner (2022 & 2023)
- East Africa Youth for Climate Action Award – Regional climate innovation recognition by ICPAC/IGAD
- TotalEnergies Startup of the Year – Best business creation model (2021/2022)
- Yale top 30 startups in Africa – Yale Africa Startup Review (2023)

== See also ==
- Circular economy
- Water hyacinth
- Climate change in Africa
- Social entrepreneurship
- Environmental engineering
