= Patrick Mariru =

Kenyan politician (born 1978)

Doctor Patrick Mariru
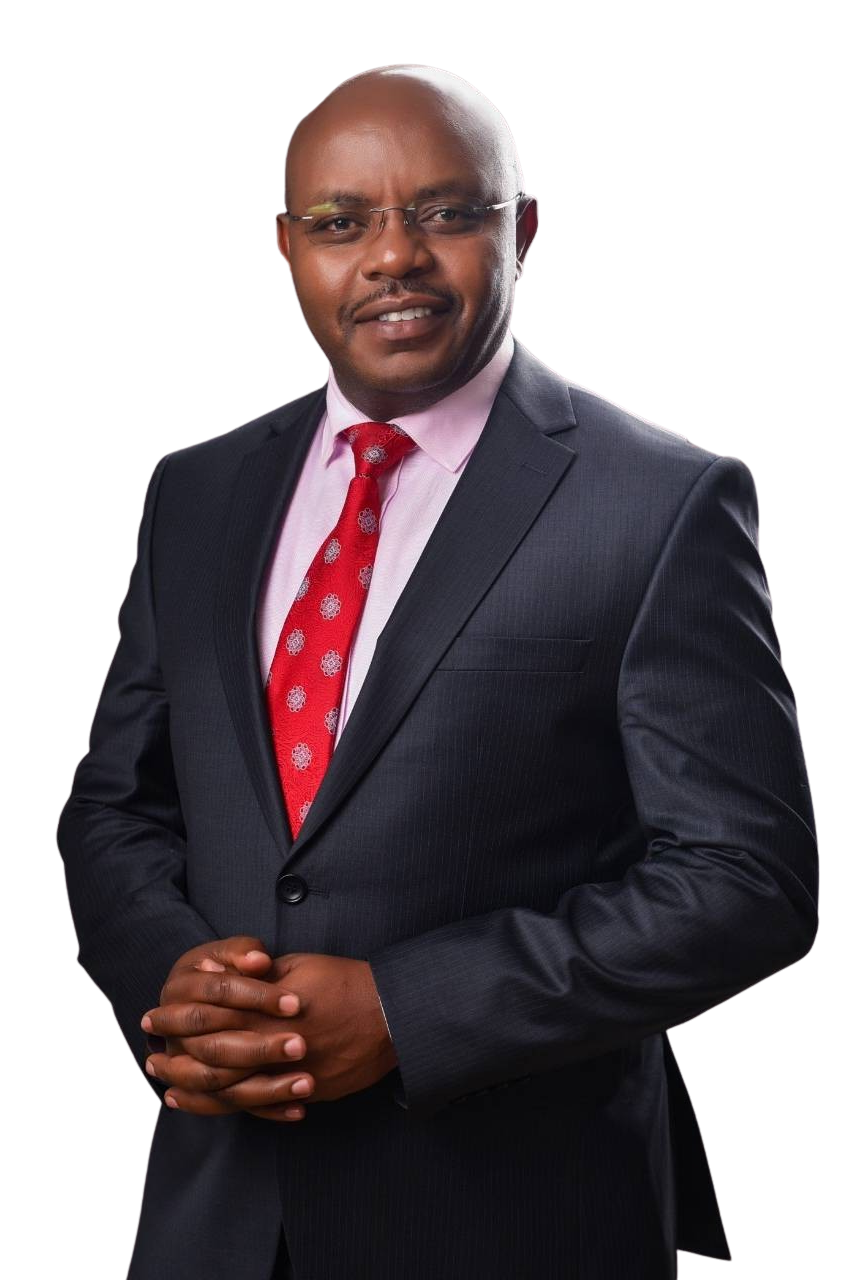

Permanent Secretary Ministry of Defence
- Incumbent
- Assumed office 2 December 2022

Member of the National Assembly Laikipia West
- In office 31 August 2017 – 2022
- Preceded by: Wachira Karani
- Succeeded by: Wachira Karani

Speaker, County Assembly of Laikipia
- Incumbent
- Assumed office 2013
- Succeeded by: Patrick Waigwa

Personal details
- Born: 5 July 1978 (age 48)
- Party: JP
- Education: University of Nairobi Bachelor of Laws; Kenya School of Law Diploma in Law; University of London Master’s Degree of Science in Public Policy and Management and in Divinity; JKUAT Doctor of Philosophy in Leadership and Governance
- Occupation: Governence Consultancy

Patrick Mariru (born 1978) is an advocate who is serving as a Principal Secretary in the Government of Kenya in the Ministry of Defence. He has also served as the Member of Parliament for Laikipia West Constituency from 2017 to 2022, having previously been the inaugural Speaker of the County Assembly of Laikipia County.
