= Xander Rawlins =

English singer-songwriter, multi-instrumentalist and record producer

Alexander Rawlins
- Born: London
- Education: Bedford School; Royal Military Academy Sandhurst
- Occupations: Singer-songwriter, musician, record producer, british army officer
- Known for: LAIKIPIA. Pally Ink.
- Military career
- Allegiance: United Kingdom
- Branch: British Army
- Service years: 2006–2011
- Rank: Captain
- Unit: Grenadier Guards
- Conflicts: Afghanistan

Alexander Rawlins is an English singer-songwriter, multi-instrumentalist, and record producer. He is the lead vocalist and one half of the Indie Electronic duo, LAIKIPIA, and released the first single, "Midnight Love" from Pally Ink in 2024. He began his career as a British army officer serving in Afghanistan.

== Career ==
Xander Rawlins, whose full first name is Alexander, attended Bedford School, Bedford, England, and Oxford Brookes University. After graduating, he attended The Royal Military Academy Sandhurst and was commissioned into the Grenadier Guards in 2007. In 2009, he deployed to Afghanistan as an Infantry platoon commander in charge of 30 men.

BBC Three television broadcast a documentary series entitled Our War: 10 years in Afghanistan. The second of the three episodes covered Captain Alex Rawlins filming and interviewing his men from the 1st Battalion, the Grenadier Guards, about their experiences. It also captured events surrounding the death of Guardsman Jamie Janes, a soldier from his platoon, who died on 5 October 2009 after stepping on an IED. Janes' death increased the British public's awareness of the human cost of Improvised explosive devices (IEDs). The documentary Our War won "Best Documentary Series" and "Best Multichannel Programme" at the Broadcast Awards 2012, and a BAFTA for "Best Factual Series".

Rawlins began writing and recording music as a teenager. He co-created music with lifelong friend Sam Phillips, under the name "The RawLips". In 2005, while at university in Oxford, Rawlins formed the band "Pulling Claudia" (later changed to "The Rawlins") with Phillips on lead, brother Digby on keys, Henry Latham on drums, and Ben Dimond on bass. In 2009, while still in Afghanistan, Rawlins started singing as lead vocalist and guitarist in his platoon's band, "The Renegade Irritations," also nicknamed "The Helmand Philharmonic," to entertain the soldiers.

In 2020, Rawlins released the album "10 Years," so titled because it contained songs that had been recorded in Los Angeles a decade prior but never released. The EP "Alive I Dream (The Lost Songs") was released in 2024.

=== "1000 Miles Apart" ===
"1000 Miles Apart"

Single by Xander Rawlins
- Released: 13 December 2010 (on iTunes)
- Songwriter: Xander Rawlins

Xander Rawlins singles chronology
"1000 Miles Apart"	""We See You""

Rawlins started writing "1000 Miles Apart" in England and finished it in Helmand Province, Afghanistan, in Christmas 2009. A tribute to Jamie Janes, it was about a soldier on the battlefield longing to be home for Christmas. The recording, with extra footage from the battalion soldiers, was meant to be sent by them to their families and friends. British Forces Broadcasting Service radio and television, the British Forces News and mainstream news networks and newspapers promoted the release of 1000 Miles Apart as a potential No. 1 at Christmas. All proceeds were pledged to the Army Benevolent Fund The Soldiers' Charity (ABF) and to the Combat Stress charity for serving men and women suffering from posttraumatic stress disorder (PTSD) and other mental health issues.

=== Soldier in Blue ===
In 2012, Rawlins co-founded Soldier in Blue, a consultancy firm that provides serving and ex-service personnel and their dependents to the entertainment industry as extras and advisors. They have worked on productions such as the musical Les Miserables, the programme Monuments Men, the BBC documentary Our World War, the films Fury, Testament of Youth, Suffragette and the Star Wars saga.

=== LAIKIPIA ===
LAIKIPIA
- Origin: Los Angeles, California
- Genre: Electronic music
- Years active: 2017–present
- Label: LAIKIPIA Music
- Members: Xander Rawlins; Taylor Harrison

In 2017, Xander co-founded the trans-Atlantic Indie electronic duo LAIKIPIA and the record company LAIKIPIA Music with the American classically trained musician and electronic music producer Taylor Harrison. Xander is the lead vocalist and producer of the duo, developing a distinct sound that combines harmony-driven storytelling, dance floor beats, and melody-rich instrumentals. The singles released include the debut "Hello Dreamer", followed by "Down Down' that featured Thurz, "Living Outside" and "I Know Love". Further releases include "That Feeling" in 2019 and "Big Fish" in 2020.

In 2021, LAIKIPIA released their debut album "All Hail Hyperion", leading to them being named one of People Magazine's "Emerging Artists of 2022".

=== Pally Ink ===
During the COVID pandemic, Rawlins lived in a shed overlooking the River Dart. It was here that work began on the new project Pally Ink, dubbed 'The world's oldest Korporation'.

== Discography ==
=== Albums ===
- 2020: "10 Years" - Xander Rawlins
- 2022: "All Hail Hyperion" - LAIKIPIA

=== EPs ===
- 2010: 1000 Miles Apart EP - Xander Rawlins
- 2018: "Heartbeats & Echoes" - LAIKIPIA

=== Singles ===
Xander Rawlins

- 2010: "1000 Miles Apart" – Xander Rawlins
- 2013: "We See You" – Xander Rawlins
- 2020: "10 Years" Album - Xander Rawlins
- 2024: "Alive I Dream (The Lost Songs)" EP - Xander Rawlins

LAIKIPIA

- 2017: "Hello Dreamer" – LAIKIPIA
- 2017: "Down Down" (feat Thurz) – LAIKIPIA
- 2017: "Living Outside" – LAIKIPIA
- 2017: "I Know Love" – LAIKIPIA
- 2019: "That Feeling" – LAIKIPIA
- 2020: "Big Fish" - LAIKIPIA
- 2021: "The Hits Keep Coming" - LAIKIPIA
- 2021: "Fly By" - LAIKIPIA
- 2021: "All Hail Hyperion" - LAIKIPIA

==== Pally Ink ====
- 2024: "Midnight Love" - Pally Ink
- 2024: "Take A Look At Me" - Pally Ink
- 2024: "The Gamble (Foreverever)" - Pally Ink
