= Laikipia East Constituency =

Kenyan electoral constituency

Laikipia East
- constituency for the Parliament of Kenya
- Laikipia East Constituency within Laikipia County

- Laikipia County within Kenya
- County: Laikipia
- Population: 102,815
- Area: 1,539 km^{2} (594.2 sq mi)

Current constituency
- Number of members: 1
- Party: TSP
- Member of Parliament: Mwangi Kiunjuri
- Wards: 5

Laikipia East Constituency is an electoral constituency in Kenya. It is one of three constituencies in Laikipia County, in the former Rift Valley Province. The constituency was established for the 1966 elections.

== Members of Parliament ==
Elections	MP	Party	Notes
1966	G. Githui Vuvuzella Ndegwa	KANU	One-party system
1969	Tom Gichohi	KANU	One-party system
1974	G. Githui Vuvuzella Ndegwa	KANU	One-party system
1979	Charles Ndirangu Muthura	KANU	One-party system
1983	Charles Ndirangu Muthura	KANU	One-party system
1988	Kausai Francis Xavier ole Kaparo	KANU	One-party system
1992	Charles Nderitu Mukora	DP	
1997	Festus Mwangi Kiunjuri	DP	
2002	Festus Mwangi Kiunjuri	NARC	
2007	Festus Mwangi Kiunjuri	PNU	
2013	Anthony Mutahi Kimaru	TNA	
2017	Amin Deddy Mohamed Ali	JP	
2022	Festus Mwangi Kiunjuri	TSP	

== Wards ==
Wards
Ward	Population	Sub County
Ngobit	36,498	Laikipia Central
Tigithi	37,604	Laikipia Central
Thingithu	39,592	Laikipia East
Nanyuki	40,235	Laikipia East
Umande	20,445	Laikipia East
Total	174,374	
*2023,
