= Laikipia North Constituency =

Electoral constituency of Kenya

Laikipia North
- constituency for the Parliament of Kenya
- Laikipia North Constituency within Laikipia County

- Laikipia County within Kenya
- County: Laikipia
- Population: 36,184
- Area: 2,550 km^{2} (984.6 sq mi)

Current constituency
- Number of members: 1
- Party: JP
- Member of Parliament: Sarah Paulata Korere
- Wards: 4

Laikipia North (sub-county) is a constituency in Kenya. It is one of three constituencies in Laikipia County.

== Members ==
| Elections | MP | Party | Notes |
|---|---|---|---|
| 2013 | Mathew Lekidime Lempurkel | ODM | |
| 2017 | Sara Korere | Jubilee | |
| 2022 | Sara Korere | Jubilee | |

== Wards ==
Population of wards in 2023
| Ward | Population | Sub County |
|---|---|---|
| Sosian | 41,847 | Laikipia North |
| Segera | 22,196 | Laikipia North |
| Mukogodo West | 18,192 | Laikipia North |
| Mukogodo East | 24,808 | Laikipia North |
| Total | 107,042 | |
