= Joshua Irungu =

Kenyan politician

Joshua Wakahora Irūngū, EGH

Governor Laikipia County
- Incumbent
- Assumed office 9 August 2022

Personal details
- Born: 2 February 1970 (age 56)
- Party: UDA
- Spouse: Grace Wakahora
- Children: 4
- Education: Egerton University (B.A Natural resources management); M.A Agriculture and Community development
- Occupation: Community development specialist
- Committees: Chairman Water Services Regulatory Board (Wasreb Kenya)
- Website: https://joshuairungu.co.ke

Joshua Wakahora Irūngū (born 2 February 1970) is a Kenyan politician and community development specialist. He was appointed to the position of Chairperson of Water Services Regulatory Board (WASREB) in February 2019. He is the first and third governor of the County of Laikipia first serving from 2013 to 2017, representing the Jubilee Coalition party TNA and securing a return running on a UDA ticket in 2022.

== Education ==
Joshua Irūngū holds a master's degree in Agriculture and Rural Development in addition to a bachelor's degree in Resource Management from Egerton University.

== Career ==
Up until the year 2000, Joshua Irūngū was a civil servant in Kenya's Ministry of Agriculture. He was in charge of Agriculture and Livestock Development officers in charge of Laikipia West and Nyahururu divisions of what was then Laikipia District. He resigned from government and joined USAID, for whom he was in charge of the International Small Group and Tree planting programme(ISGTPP). In total he has over 15 years experience in Community Development programmes in Laikipia County.

== 2013 General Elections ==
Joshua Irūngū, and his running mate Josephat Kabugi Gitonga won the 2013 Gubernatorial election in Laikipia County by a landslide, having secured the nomination of the National Alliance party earlier in the year.

Candidate	Running Mate	Coalition	Party	Votes
Irungu, Joshua Wakahora	Kabugi, Josphat Gitonga		TNA	21,561 (57.4%)
Kamau, Richard Mburu	Shuel, Joseph Njalis		AP	1,883 (5.0%)
Kiunjiri, Festus Mwangi	Gichuhi, David Maina		GNU	10,889 (29.0%)
Muriithi, Ndiritu	Putunoi, Jane Tingis		UDFP	3,257 (8.7%)

== Governorship Tenure ==
Joshua Irungu's tenure as governor ran into controversy due to his association with a move by Kenyan politicians calling for the evicting of white settlers from the country. He was said to have demanded the departure of settlers of British origin from Laikipia County for 'failure to support deferral of cases facing President Uhuru Kenyatta and his deputy William Ruto at the international Criminal Court' a statement for which he later apologized.

== 2017 General Elections ==
Joshua Irungu was narrowly defeated in the 2017 Governor's race by Independent candidate Ndiritu Muriithi.

== 2022 General Elections ==
In the 2022 general elections Joshua Irungu, running as the United Democratic Alliance party candidate of the Kenya Kwanza alliance, won back the governorship of Laikipia from Nderitu Muriithi. He garnered 113,783 votes while Muriithi, who was vying on a Jubilee ticket under Azimio la Umoja coalition came second with 48,563 votes.

== Family ==
Joshua Irungu is married to Grace Wakahora and a father of three sons and a daughter.
