= Laikipia West Constituency =

Constituency in Laikipia County, Kenya

Laikipia West
- constituency for the Parliament of Kenya
- Laikipia West Constituency within Laikipia County

- Laikipia County within Kenya
- County: Laikipia
- Population: 129,263
- Area: 3,372 km^{2} (1,301.9 sq mi)

Current constituency
- Number of members: 1
- Party: UDA
- Member of Parliament: Wachira Wachira Karani
- Wards: 6

Laikipia West Constituency is an electoral constituency in Kenya. It is one of three constituencies in Laikipia County. The constituency was established for the 1966 elections.

== Members of Parliament ==
Election	MP	Party
1966	Godfrey Gitahi Kariuki	KANU (Note: One-party system)
1969	Godfrey Gitahi Kariuki	KANU
1974	Godfrey Gitahi Kariuki	KANU
1979	Godfrey Gitahi Kariuki	KANU
1983	Joseph Githae Mathenge	KANU
1988	Danson Ndumia Murukia	KANU
1992	Dixon Kihika Kimani	DP
1997	F. Chege Mbitiru	DP
2002	Godfrey Gitahi Kariuki	NARC
2007	Ndiritu Muriithi	PNU
2013	Wachira Karani	TNA
2017	Patrick Mariru	Jubilee Party
2022	Wachira Karani	UDA

== Wards ==
Wards
Wards	Sub County	Population
Ol Moran	Laikipia West Sub County	26,231
Rumuruti Township	Laikipia West	40,149
Githiga	Laikipia West	34,188
Marmanet	Laikipia West	62,882
Igwamiti	Nyahururu	86,096
Salama	Laikipia West	35,343
Total		86,152
June 2025,
