= Alliance High School (Kenya) =

Boys school in Kikuyu, Kenya

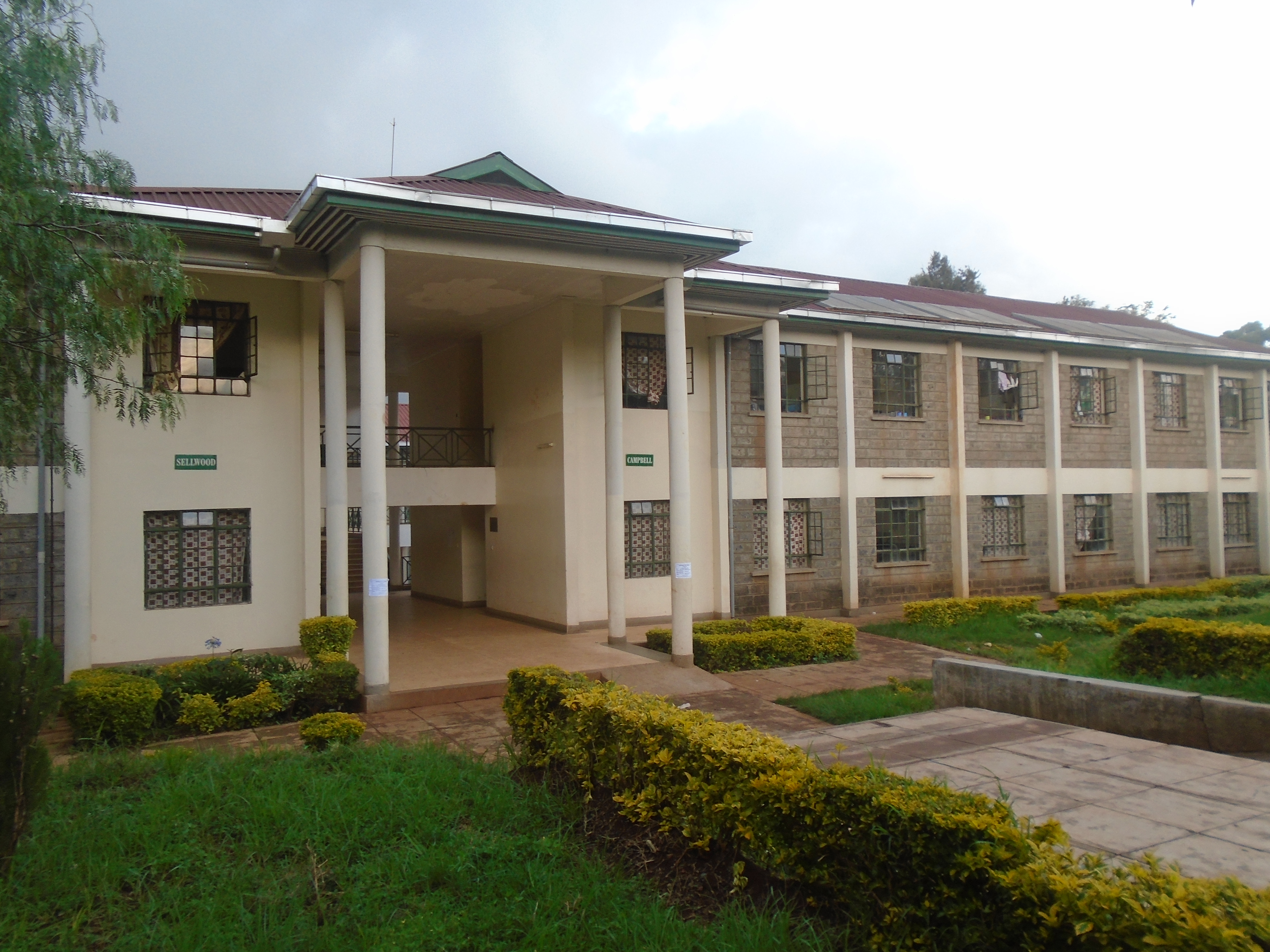
- New complex, completed in 2009

Location
- Kikuyu, Kiambu; Kenya
- Coordinates: 1°15′41″S 36°39′59″E

Information
- Other names: Bush, AHS
- Type: Public national high school
- Motto: Strong to Serve
- Established: 1 March 1926; 100 years ago
- Founders: Church of Scotland Mission; Church of the Province of Kenya; African Inland Church; Friends Church (Quakers); Methodist Church
- Sister school: Alliance Girls High School
- Principal: David K Chomba
- Gender: Boys
- Language: English
- Campus size: 153 acres
- Campus type: Suburb
- Color: Green
- Accreditation: Secondary education
- Publication: Newspaper articles
- Newspaper: The Scroll Bushfire
- Website: alliancehighschool.sc.ke

The Alliance High School (AHS) is a public national high school for boys located in Kikuyu, Kenya. The school is located approximately 22 kilometres (14 mi) from Nairobi's central business district, and a 10-minute walk from its sister school, the Alliance Girls' High School. Alliance High School was the highest ranked school in Kenya from 1960 to 1985, and has consistently scored near the top of the national league tables.

== History ==
Established on 1 March 1926 by the Alliance of Protestant Churches (the Church of Scotland Mission (later known as the Presbyterian Church of East Africa or PCEA), Church of the province of Kenya (CPK) (later known as the Anglican Church of Kenya), African Inland Church (AIC), the Friends Church (Quakers) and the Methodist Church) the school was later named the Alliance High School. It was one of the first schools in Kenya to offer secondary school education to Africans.

=== Founding ===
In the early days of the colonial era in Kenya, the colonialists believed that Africans should not be allowed an education beyond the basic level as they were only useful as a source of cheap labour, and would thus not benefit from any higher education. Missionaries who had been arriving in the country from the beginning of the 20th century strongly opposed this idea. They had been trying to set up primary schools to provide basic education to Africans, but faced challenges due to a lack of funding. Dr. John Arthur, head of the Kikuyu mission, arranged for a conference with other Protestant missions to address these problems. The first meeting took place in 1913 in Kikuyu. In 1918, the Alliance of Protestant Missions was formed, comprising the Church of Scotland Mission, the Church of the province of Kenya, the African Inland Mission, the Friends Church (Quakers) and the Methodist Church Arthur pushed the British government to open education to Kenyans and all Africans in all colonies. He believed that Kenyans should be given access to primary, secondary and tertiary level education as a matter of right. His efforts led to the Devonshire White Paper of 1923, which gave African colonial subjects the right to quality education. Arthur realised the need to have new institutions set up, establishing a high school for Africans in Kikuyu. The school was established on 1 March 1926 under the auspices of the Alliance of Protestant Missions, as the Alliance High School, with the agreement of the government, opposed to the hegemony of religious education, and wishing for the development of basic vocational education. At the very beginning, agriculture plays a large role and each student is responsible for their own garden. From its second year, AHS offers more diversified training, as shorthand, typing and carpentry. From 1938, the school offers a 4-year general coursus, leading to the Cambridge School Certificate, which allows students to pursue higher education, and Vocational education was abandoned in 1942.

== Academics ==
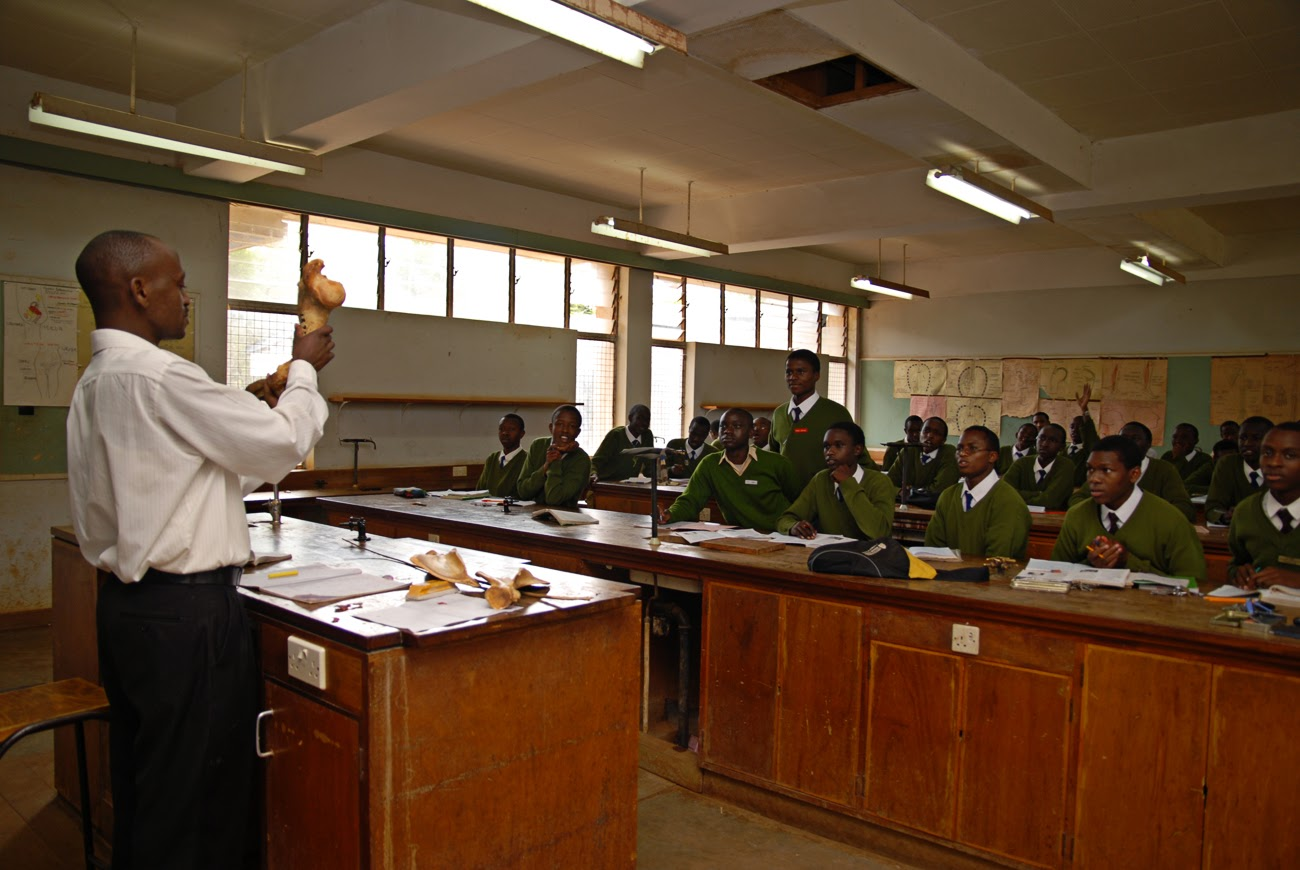
AHS Students in a biology class

The school is the highest performing high school in Kenya academically, ranked within the top ten best schools in each year's National Examinations. The school had the best results in the national exams continuously from 1960 to 1985. In 1986, it lost its top ranking for the first time in 25 years, slipping to third. It was ranked first in the country in 2005 based on the results of the Kenya Certificate of Secondary Education (KCSE). In 2006, it was ranked third. In 2009 and 2010, the school emerged top in the KCSE results. In 2011, the school dropped one place to second. In 2013 the school was on top again with an average grade of A−.

== Recent Achievements ==
In 2024, Alliance High School recorded a significant improvement in the Kenya Certificate of Secondary Education (KCSE) results. The school had 100 students earn an A grade, with the mean score rising from 9.5 in 2023 to 10.31 in 2024. According to an interview with Principal David Kamau by the Kenya News Agency on 14 September 2025, the school attributed its success to teamwork, discipline, and maintaining good health among students and staff.

== Alumni ==
- George Anyona
- Ngũgĩ wa Thiong'o
- Njoroge Mungai
- Joseph Maina Mungai
- James Orengo, politician (Siaya Governor), lawyer and human rights activist
- Charles Njonjo
- Jaramogi Oginga Odinga
- Ochilo Ayacko
- James Ole Kiyiapi
- Joseph Nguthiru
- Anyang' Nyong'o
- Kimani Ichung'wah
