= Egerton University =

Public university in Kenya

Egerton University (EU)
- Motto: Transforming Lives through Quality Education
- Type: Public university
- Established: 1939
- Chancellor: Dr. Narendra Rameshchandra Raval, EBS
- Vice-Chancellor: Prof. Isaac O. Kibwage, HSC
- Academic staff: 468
- Administrative staff: 516
- Undergraduates: 28,000
- Postgraduates: 7,000
- Location: Biashara kilimo road Egerton University, Kenya, Njoro, Nakuru, Kenya; 00°22′11″S 35°55′58″E
- Campus: 740 acres (300 ha)
- Website: www.egerton.ac.ke

Egerton University is a public university in Kenya. It is the oldest institution of higher education in Kenya.

== Location ==
The main campus of the university is located in Njoro, a small community approximately 25 kilometres (16 mi), southwest of the town of Nakuru. This is located approximately 182 kilometres (113 mi), by road, northwest of Nairobi, the capital and largest city in Kenya.

== History ==
The school was founded in 1939, and was originally named Egerton Farm School. It was established by a large land grant of 740 acres (3 km²) by Maurice Egerton, 4th Baron Egerton of Tatton. The school's original purpose was to prepare white European youth for careers in agriculture. By 1955, the name had changed to Egerton Agricultural College. A one-year certificate course and a two-year diploma course in agriculture were offered. In 1958, Lord Egerton donated another 1,100 acres (4.5 km^{2}) of land. Soon afterwards, the college opened its doors to people of all races from Kenya and other African countries.

In 1979, with support from the Government of Kenya and USAID, the college expanded yet again, becoming part of the University of Nairobi system. In 1987, the college was recognized as a chartered public university.

== University ranking ==
- Ranked First (1st) in Kenya on Impact Ranking by webometrics (July 2021 Rankings)

== University governance ==
- Office of the Chancellor
- The University Council
- The University Management Board (UMB)
- The University Senate

== Campuses ==
Egerton University has three campuses, one of them being a constituent college.

- The main campus is based at Njoro and houses the faculties of Agriculture, Arts & Social Sciences, Education & Community Studies, Engineering & Technology, Environment & Resources Development, Science & Veterinary Medicine.
- The Kenyatta Campus is located 5 kilometres (3 mi) from Njoro Campus and houses the School of Open and Distance Learning (SoDL) programmes.
- Nakuru Town Campus College, which is the only University's Campus College and hosts the Faculties of Commerce, Health Sciences and Law.

== Directorates and boards ==
- Directorate of Marketing and Resource Mobilization (DMRM)
- Directorate of Research & Extension
- Directorate of Quality Assurance (DQA)
- Directorate of Planning and Development (DPD)
- Directorate of University Welfare Services
- Directorate of Centre for Capacity Building
- Directorate of Examinations and Timetabling
- Directorate of International Linkages and Career Services
- Directorate of Legal Affairs
- Directorate of Income Generating Unit (IGU)
- Directorate of Crop Management Research Training (CMRT)
- Directorate of Dryland Research Training Ecotourism Centre (DRTEC)
- Directorate of Agro-Science Park
- The Board of Undergraduate studies and Field Attachment Programmes (BUGs)
- The Board of Board of Postgraduate Studies

== Institutes of Egerton University ==
- The Institute of Women, Gender and Development Studies (IWGDs)
- Tegemeo Institute of Agricultural Policy and Development
- Confucius Institute

== Schools ==
- School of Open and Distance Learning (SoDL)

== Faculties of Egerton University ==
The University has ten (10) faculties, subdivided into fifty three (53) academic departments offering programmes at diploma, undergraduate, and postgraduate levels:

1. Faculty of Agriculture
2. Faculty of Arts and Social Sciences
3. Faculty of Commerce
4. Faculty of Education and Community Studies
5. Faculty of Engineering and Technology
6. Faculty of Environment and Resource Development
7. Faculty of Health Sciences
8. Faculty of Law
9. Faculty of Science
10. Faculty of Veterinary Medicine & Surgery

== Academic departments ==
The Academic Departments responsible for teaching and learning.

- Department of Agricultural Economics & Agribusiness Management
- Department of Agricultural Education and Extension
- Department of Agricultural Engineering
- Department of Animal Sciences
- Department of Applied Development And Community Studies
- Department of Biochemistry
- Department of Biological Sciences
- Department of Business Administration
- Department of Chemistry
- Department of Crops, Horticulture and Soils
- Department of Civil Engineering
- Department of Clinical Medicine
- Department of Computer Science
- Department of Curriculum And Instruction
- Department of Economics
- Department of Electrical Engineering
- Department of Environmental Science
- Department of Geography
- Department of History, Philosophy and Religion
- Department of Human Anatomy
- Department of Human Nutrition
- Department of Industrial Energy
- Department of Literature Language And Linguistics
- Department of Mathematics
- Department of Medicine, Child Health and Community Health
- Department of Natural Resources
- Department of Nursing
- Department of Peace, Security and Social Studies
- Department of Physics
- Department of Surgery and Reproductive Health
- Department of Medical Physiology

== Research departments ==
- Agricultural Resource Centre
- Botanic Garden
- Egerton Castle
- Egerton University Press
- Crop Management And Research
- Tegemeo Institute
- Student Theses

== Administrative departments ==
- Alumni Alumni Relations Office
- Communications and Marketing Department
- Audit.
- Giftshop.
- Bookshop.
- Department of Admissions.
- Estates Department.
- Information Communication And Technology.
- Halls Department.
- Department of Catering.
- Department of Human Capital & Administration.
- Medical Department.
- Nursing Department.
- Department of Pensions.
- Department of Planning.
- Procurement Department.
- Department of Security.
- Department of Sports.
- Tatton Farm.
- Transport Department.
- Department of Water And Sewerage.

== Courses offered ==
The university offers many academic programs. Students can receive a three-year diploma, a bachelor's degree, master's degree, or a doctorate (PhD).

In 2004, the university established a partnership with Western Michigan University that allows students to complete half of their degree at Egerton and finish their studies at WMU in a choice of computer science, engineering and business administration.

== Flagship research projects ==
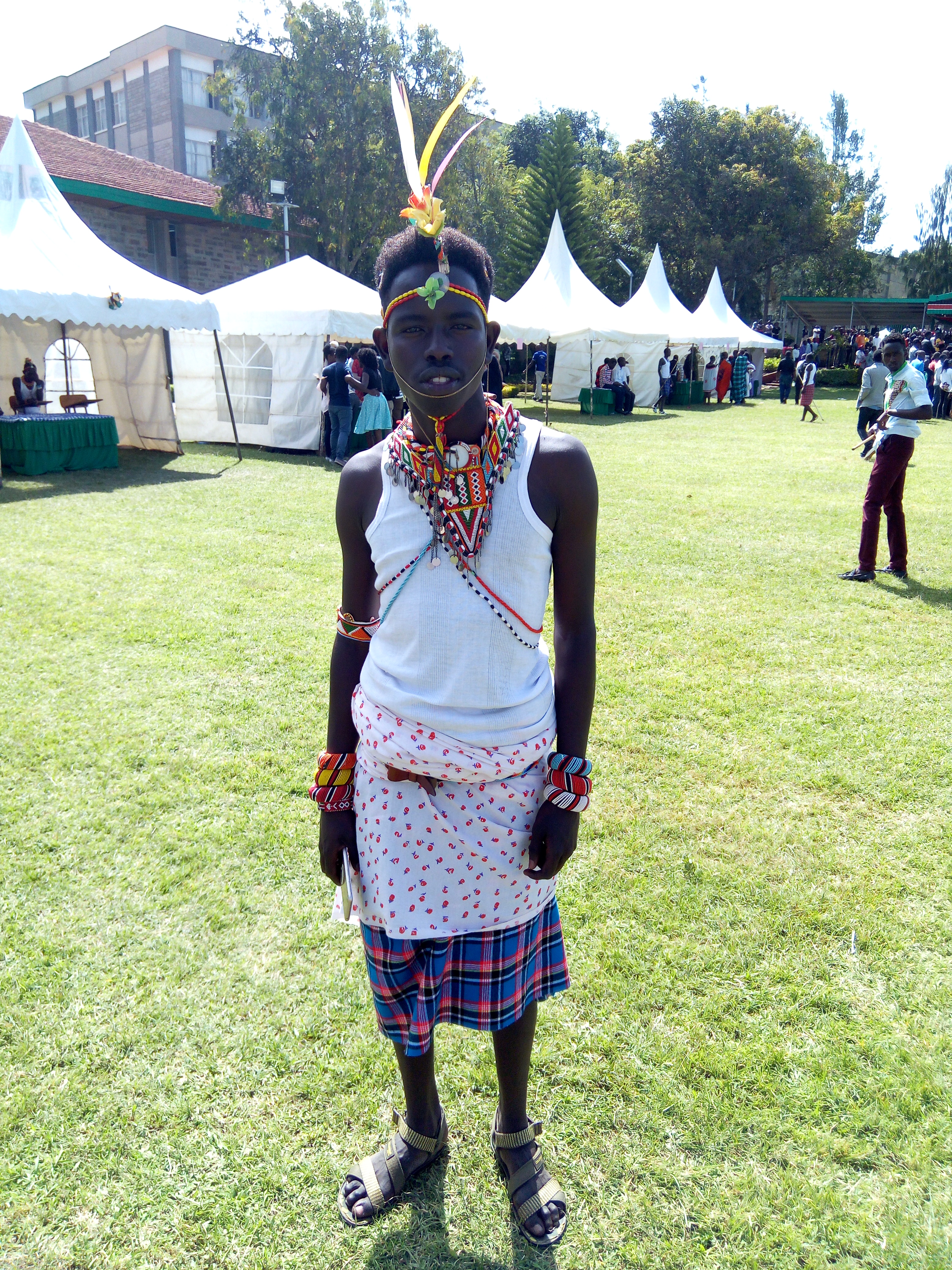
Student from the Pokomo community showcases his heritage by wearing cultural clothes during the annual culture week

- Chemeron Dryland Research Training & Ecotourism Centre - DRTEC
- Njoro River Rehabilitation Project
- Agro-Science Park.
- Transforming African Agricultural Universities to Meaningfully Contribute to Africa's Growth and Development (TAGDev)
- Centre of Excellence in Sustainable Agriculture and Agribusiness Management (CESAAM)
- Faculty of Law Legal Aid Project (FOLLAP)

== Notable alumni ==
- Samuel Atandi, member of the national assembly
- Mercy Chebeni (born 1992), accountant and Orange Democratic Movement politician
- Hon. Joshua Irungu, Governor Laikipia County.
- Hon. Amb. Ukur Yatani Kanacho, Cabinet Secretary, National Treasury & Planning, Kenya.
- Dr. Chris Kiptoo, Principal Secretary National Treasury.
- Prof. John Krop Lonyangapuo, Second governor of West Pokot county
- Hon. Salim Mvurya, Governor, Kwale County, Kenya.
- Joseph Nguthiru, UN Young Champion of the Earth, and Obama Leader.
- Hon. Frederick Sumaye, Former Prime Minister, Tanzania.
- Mr Peter Tabichi, Winner of the global prize for the world's best teacher and one of the TOP most influential Africans.
- Hon. Anne Waiguru, former Cabinet Secretary and Governor of Kirinyaga County.

== See also ==
- List of universities in Kenya
- Education in Kenya
- Egerton family
- Lord Egerton Castle
