= The Service Party =

Political party in Kenya

- Abbreviation: TSP
- Founder: Mwangi Kiunjuri
- Founded: 2020
- Headquarters: Nairobi, Kenya
- National affiliation: Kenya Kwanza
- Colors: Yellow
- Slogan: "Huduma, Twajiamini"
- National Assembly: 2 / 349
- Senate: 0 / 67

The Service Party (TSP) is a political party in Kenya. The party primary colors are yellow and red, with the party symbol being a heart inside a circle. The party slogan is "Huduma, Twajiamini".

== History ==
The party was founded in 2020 by Mwangi Kiunjuri, who was the former Agriculture Cabinet Secretary dropped from the cabinet by President Uhuru Kenyatta. The party has its Headquarters in Nairobi, along Matumbato Road.

The Service Party contested the 2022 Kenyan general election as part of Kenya Kwanza.

== See also ==
- List of political parties in Kenya
- National Assembly of Kenya
- Politics of Kenya
- Parliament of Kenya
- Senate of Kenya
