= Mwangi Kiunjuri =

Kenyan politician (born 1967)

Kìūnjūri Festus Mwangi

Member of Parliament for Laikipia East Constituency
- In office 1997–2013
- Constituency: Laikipia East

Personal details
- Born: April 29, 1969 (age 57) Kieni, Nyeri County
- Party: Democratic Party (Kenya) (1997–2007), Party of National Unity (Kenya) (2007–2013), The Service Party (2020–present)
- Education: Moi University
- Occupation: Politician
- Cabinet: Cabinet Secretary for Devolution and Planning (2015–2017), Cabinet Secretary for Agriculture (2018–2020)

Kìūnjūri Festus Mwangi (born April 18, 1969) is a politician born in Kieni, Nyeri County. He has held various political and government positions.

== Education and Political life ==
Education

Mwangi Kìūnjūri graduated from Moi University with a Bachelor of Education (Arts) degree in 1994.

Political life

Kìūnjūri was first elected to the parliament in 1997 as a member of the Democratic Party. He retained his seat in the 2002 elections. As a member of the Party of National Unity, he was elected to represent Laikipia East Constituency in the 2007 Kenyan parliamentary election. He left office in 2013.

Kìūnjūri has also served in the Kenyan cabinet in various capacities. In 2015, he became the cabinet secretary for Devolution and Planning, replacing Anne Waiguru after she resigned due to corruption allegations. Following the Jubilee government's retention of power in the 2017 general elections, President Uhuru Kenyatta appointed Kìūnjūri to be the Cabinet Secretary for Agriculture in 2018. He was relieved of this position on 14 January 2020. Later that year, he founded The Service Party. In the 2022 Kenyan general election, he returned as MP for Laikipia East Constituency.
