= Gitonga Kabugi =

Kenyan politician

Josphat Gitonga Kabugi
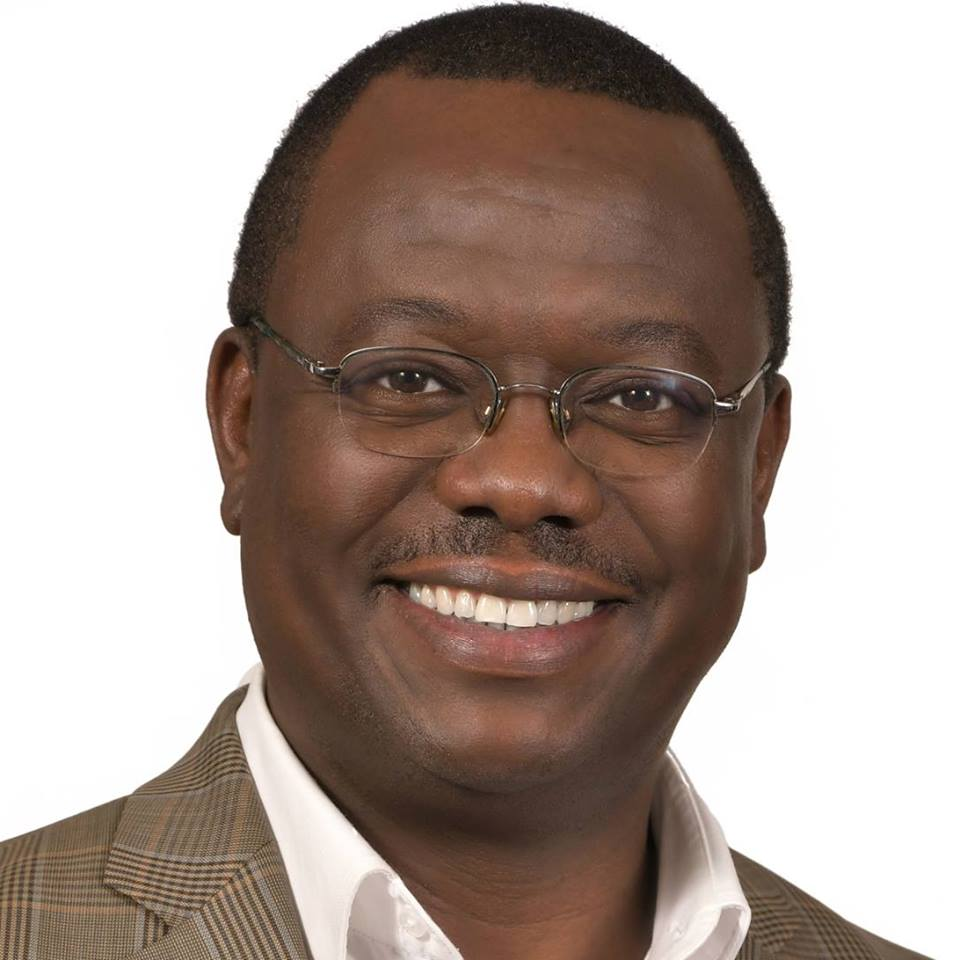

1st Deputy Governor of Laikipia County
- In office 27 March 2013 – 28 August 2017
- Preceded by: Position established
- Succeeded by: John Mwaniki

Personal details
- Born: 22 November 1966 (age 59) Thingithu, Nanyuki
- Party: TNA

Josphat Gitonga Kabugi is a Kenyan politician and was Deputy Governor of Laikipia County between 2013 and 2017.
