= Rumuruti =

- Location within Kenya
- Coordinates: 0.25996°N 36.53633°E
- Country: Kenya
- County: Laikipia County
- Elevation: 1,828 m (5,997 ft)

Population
  - City: 31,649
  - Urban: 4,249
- Time zone: UTC+3 (EAT)

Rumuruti is a town in Laikipia County in Kenya's former Rift Valley Province. It is approximately 40 kilometers due north of Nyahururu, on the Nyahururu-Maralal road (A4). Despite being smaller than either Nanyuki or Nyahururu, which are on the Southeastern and Southwestern corners of Laikipia respectively, its central location meant that it was selected as the administrative headquarters of the new Laikipia County government in 2013. In 2013 a local business launched a plan to build a KES200 million meat processing facility in the town.

Scenes from the Hollywood film King Solomon's Mines were shot in the town.

== Economy ==
The town's residents are livestock keepers, with approximately 500 cattle, 1,200 sheep, and goats, sold at the town's weekly livestock auction.
