= Laikipia County =

Coordinates: 0°5′N 36°40′E

- County
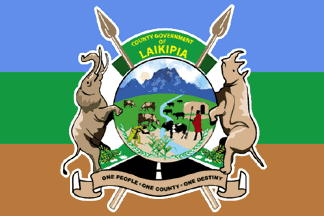
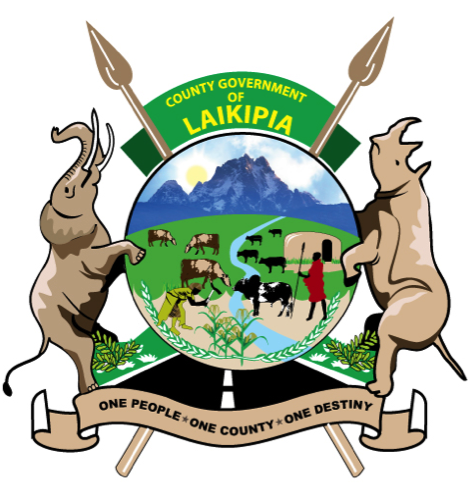
- Flag Coat of arms

- Location in Kenya
- Country: Kenya
- Formed: 4 March 2013
- Capital: Rumuruti

Government
  - Governor: Joshua Irungu

Area
  - Total: 8,696.1 km^{2} (3,357.6 sq mi)

Population (2019)
  - Total: 518,560
  - Density: 59.631/km^{2} (154.44/sq mi)
- Time zone: UTC+3 (EAT)
- Website: laikipia.go.ke

Laikipia County is one of the 47 counties of Kenya, located on the equator in the northern Mount Kenya region. Laikipia is a cosmopolitan county and is listed as county number 31. The county has two major urban centres: Nanyuki to the southeast, and Nyahururu to the southwest. Its county government headquarters town is Rumuruti.

The county lies between latitudes 0° 18" south and 0° 51" north and between longitudes 36° 11" and 37° 24' east. It borders Samburu County to the north, Isiolo County to the north east, Meru County to the east, Nyeri County to the south east, Nyandarua County to the south, Nakuru County to the south west and Baringo County to the west.

Economic activities in the county consists mainly of tourism and agriculture, chiefly grain crops, ranching and greenhouse horticulture.

The county encompasses the high, dry Laikipia Plateau, and has a cool, temperate climate with both rainy and dry seasons.

== Demographics ==
Laikipia County has a total population of 518,560, of whom 259,440 are males, 259,102 females and 18 intersex persons. There are 149,271 households with an average household size of 3.4 persons per household and a population density of 54 people per square kilometre.

== Religion ==
Religion in Laikipia County

Religion (2019 Census)	Number
Catholicism	147,752
Protestant	152,699
Evangelical Churches	108,701
African Instituted Churches	35,236
Orthodox	1,648
Other Christian	27,854
Islam	8,475
Hindu	205
Traditionists	7,127
Other	7,238
No religion/atheism	15,695
Don't know	1,221
Not stated	28

== Administrative and political units ==
=== Administrative units ===
There are five sub-counties, fifteen county assembly wards, and 52 locations.

==== Sub-counties ====
- Laikipia Central
- Laikipia East
- Laikipia North
- Laikipia West
- Nyahururu
- Kirima (newly created)

==== Electoral constituencies ====
- Laikipia East Constituency
- Laikipia West Constituency
- Laikipia North Constituency

=== Political leadership ===
Joshua Irungu is the current governor, serving his second and final term as governor. He returned after governor Ndiritu Muriithi defeated him in the 2017 general elections. He is deputised by Reuben Kamuri, the current Deputy Governor, after Irungu did not run a second time with his previous deputy governor Gitonga Kabugi. John Kinyua Nderitu is the senator. He has been in office since 2017, replacing the first senator, Godfrey Gitahi Kariuki. Jane Kagiri was elected women representative for the county in 2022.

For Laikipia County, the County Executive Committee comprises:

County Executive Committee
	Number
Governor	1
Deputy Governor	1
County Secretary	1
CEC Members	6
Total	9

==== Members of Parliament 2022–2027 (Laikipia County) ====
- Hon. Mwangi Kiunjuri Laikipia East Constituency of the Service Party
- Hon. Wachira Karani of United Democratic Alliance Member of Parliament Laikipia West Constituency
- Hon. Korere, Sarah Paulata of Jubilee Party Member of Parliament Laikipia North Constituency.

== Education ==
There are 600 ECD centres, 304 primary schools and 99 secondary schools. The county has four teachers' training colleges, nine youth polytechnics, 94 adult training institutions and two universities.

== Health ==
There are a total of 175 health facilities in the county, with three county referral hospitals, 10 sub-county hospitals, 21 health centers and 141 dispensaries. The county has 1024 health personnel of different cadre. The HIV prevalence rate stands at 3.2 per cent.

== Transport and communication ==
The county has 1112.2 km of road. Of this, 77.0 km is an earth surface, 705.5 km is a murram and 319.7 km is bitumen.

There are 19 post offices with 2,299 installed letter boxes, 2,079 rented letter boxes and 220 vacant letter boxes.

== Administrative divisions ==
Urban areas
Authority	Type	Population*
Nanyuki	Municipality	85,181
Nyahururu	Municipality	44,045
Rumuruti	Municipality	15,273
Kinamba	-	5,721
Karuga	-	2,692
Wiyumiririe	-	2,865
Total	-	155,778
* Laikipia CIDP 2025 projections. Source:

Administrative divisions
Division	Population*	Urban pop.*	Headquarters
Central	77,478	28,489	Nanyuki
Lamuria	38,517	0	Lamuria
Mukogondo	13,176	624	Dol Dol
Ngarua	65,545	2,813	Kinamba
Nyahururu	37,412	22,459	Nyahururu
Olmoran	11,069	0	
Rumuruti	78,894	4,061	Rumuruti
Total	322,187	58,466	-
* 1999 census. Sources: , ,

The county has three constituencies:

- Laikipia North Constituency
- Laikipia West Constituency
- Laikipia East Constituency

== Population ==
Historical population
Year	Pop.	±%
1979	134,524	—
1989	218,957	+62.8%
1999	322,187	+47.1%
2009	399,227	+23.9%
2019	518,560	+29.9%

== See also ==
- Marmanet
- Samburu County
- Isiolo County
- Meru County
- Nyeri County
- Nyandarua County
- Nakuru County
- Baringo County
