= Meru South District =

Former district of Kenya

Coordinates: 0°18′S 37°40′E

Meru South District, also known as Nithi District, was an unconstitutionally created district of Kenya, located in the country's Eastern Province. In 1992, Tharaka-Nithi District was split from the large Meru District. In 1998, Tharaka-Nithi was split into Meru South and Tharaka Districts. In September 2009, the Supreme Court ruled that its creation was unconstitutional, and that it belonged in Tharaka-Nithi District (which became Tharaka-Nithi County the following year).

The area of Meru South District is the home of the Ameru tribe. The people there are now predominantly Christian — Methodist, Presbyterian, Roman Catholic, and other denominations, reflecting the work of missionaries — with minorities of Indian descent, who are mainly Hindus, and of Arab descent, who are Muslims. There are also some residents of European, predominantly British, ancestry. The Chuka people are the dominant sub-tribe in the area, occupying the more arable upper region while the Tharaka people occupy the lower Igamba'ngombe division.

The district headquarters was in Chuka. The district had one constituency: Chuka/Igambang'ombe Constituency

Local authorities (councils)
Authority	Type	Population*	Urban pop.*
Chuka	Municipality	37,714	6,784
Chogoria	Town	28,637	2,500
Meru South	County	139,100	0
Total	-	205,451	9,284
* 1999 census. Source:

Administrative divisions
Division	Population*	Urban pop.*	Headquarters
Chuka	53,517	6,168	Chuka
Igambang'ombe	23,300	0	
Mugumoni	32,715	0	
Muthambi	31,539	0	
Mwimbi	64,380	1,702	Chogoria
Total	205,451	7,870	-
* 1999 census. Sources: , ,
