= List of counties of Kenya by life expectancy =

Female Life Expectancy

Male Life Expectancy

Life Expectancy by County

Life expectancy in Kenya varies considerably across its 47 counties as a result of geographical, socioeconomic and public health differences. Nyeri County records the highest life expectancy at 71.15 years, followed by Mombasa County (68.37) and Uasin Gishu County (67.69). Meanwhile, Homa Bay County has the lowest at 55.58 years, followed by Migori County (55.76) and Tana River County (57.40). Nyeri also leads in male (66.4 years) and female life expectancy (75.8) as a result of its quality healthcare., followed by Bungoma (65.5) and Baringo (65.4) among males, and Kiambu (72.8) and Laikipia (71.9) among females. Isiolo County was the only county where males lived more than females. Nyanza accounts for three of the five lowest-ranked counties, partly reflecting its historically high burden of HIV/AIDS and malaria.

== List ==
Life expectancy in Kenya by county (Total Weighted based on Gender Distribution by County)
Rank	County	Male (e₀)	Female (e₀)	Weighted e₀
Kenya		60.6	66.5	63.6
1	Nyeri	66.4	75.8	71.15
2	Mombasa	65.7	71.1	68.37
3	Uasin Gishu	63.6	71.7	67.69
4	Baringo	65.4	68.9	67.13
5	Tharaka-Nithi	63.8	70.3	67.08
6	Kiambu	60.8	72.8	66.90
7	Bungoma	65.5	68.2	66.88
8	Lamu	64.1	68.9	66.35
9	Trans Nzoia	64.4	67.9	66.16
10	Kirinyaga	59.9	71.1	65.55
11	Laikipia	59.2	71.9	65.55
12	Nandi	60.0	70.4	65.23
13	Meru	62.2	68.2	65.22
14	Taita-Taveta	61.2	69.2	65.13
15	Kakamega	63.4	66.1	64.82
16	Embu	58.7	70.1	64.40
17	Busia	62.3	66.2	64.36
18	Nairobi	62.6	65.2	63.90
19	Nakuru	58.3	69.1	63.71
20	Samburu	58.5	67.4	62.90
21	Kitui	55.7	68.8	62.46
22	Kisii	56.1	66.9	61.74
23	Murang'a	58.1	64.7	61.41
24	Vihiga	59.8	62.1	60.99
25	Nyamira	55.3	66.2	60.96
26	Machakos	57.9	63.9	60.90
27	Bomet	58.1	63.6	60.89
28	Kajiado	57.8	63.5	60.63
29	Nyandarua	58.0	63.2	60.63
30	Kericho	58.1	62.9	60.51
31	Makueni	58.1	62.4	60.27
32	Elgeyo-Marakwet	57.9	62.5	60.19
33	Marsabit	57.9	62.6	60.11
34	Isiolo	60.1	59.6	59.86
35	Narok	57.8	61.9	59.84
36	Kwale	58.2	60.7	59.47
37	West Pokot	57.6	61.1	59.36
38	Wajir	56.7	62.0	59.16
39	Mandera	57.3	60.5	58.89
40	Garissa	57.4	60.5	58.80
41	Kisumu	54.0	63.1	58.68
42	Kilifi	57.8	59.2	58.52
43	Turkana	55.9	60.0	57.88
44	Siaya	53.4	61.6	57.70
45	Tana River	56.2	58.6	57.40
46	Migori	50.5	60.6	55.76
47	Homa Bay	50.5	60.2	55.58

== See also ==
- List of African regions by life expectancy
