= Muthomi Njuki =

Kenyan politician

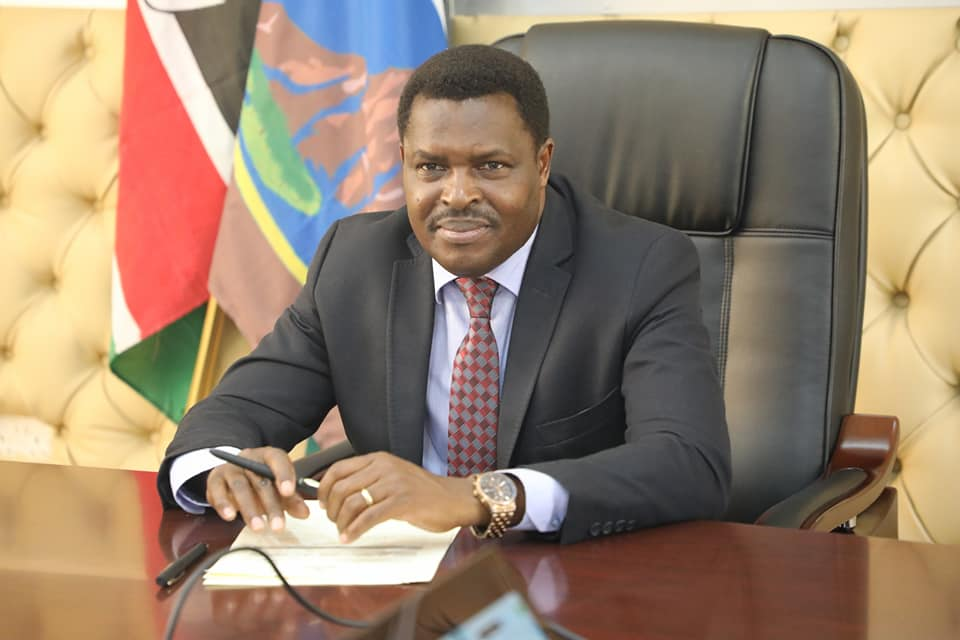

2nd Governor of Tharaka Nithi County
- Incumbent
- Assumed office 2017

Personal details
- Born: Onesmus Mūthomi Njūkì; 2 March 1968 (age 58) Meru District, Kenya
- Party: United Democratic Alliance (2021–present)
- Children: 3
- Education: Kenyatta University, University of Nairobi
- Website: tharakanithi.go.ke/governor/

Onesmus Mūthomi Njūkì is a Kenyan politician. He is the second and incumbent Governor of Tharaka Nithi County in Kenya after being re-elected on a Jubilee Party ticket in the 2017 Kenyan general election. Before being elected Governor, he served as the Chuka/Igamba ng'ombe Member of Parliament from 2013 to 2017.

== Education ==
=== Basic Education ===
After he completed his early education, he attended Chuka Boys for O level and later joined Lenana School where he completed his A levels.

=== Higher Education ===
H.E.Mūthomi Njūkì went to Kenyatta University where he earned a bachelor's degree in Education, Botany, and Zoology.

He later proceeded to do a master's degree in Entrepreneurship and Innovations Management at the University of Nairobi.

=== Hobbies/ Special Interests ===
He enjoys outdoor games and sports such as rugby which he coached.

== Career life ==
Before venturing into politics and business, Mūthomi Njūkì was a High School teacher in Kitui.

Today, Njūkì is an Entrepreneur who has worked with various telecommunications brands in Africa.

He has also been associated with Generations Electronics which grew from Generations Video Library that he operated earlier.

== Political career ==
Entry Into Politics (As a Member of Parliament)

H.E. Mūthomi Njūkì was elected to the 11th Parliament on an Alliance Party of Kenya (APK) party Jubilee Coalition in 2013.

He was a Member of Parliament for Chuka Igamba Ng’ombe Constituency in Tharaka Nithi County from 2013 to 2017.

In the National Assembly, he was a member of Public Investments Committee and also a member of the Departmental Committee on Energy, Communications and Information from March 2013.

=== Election as Governor, Year, Key Manifesto points, for the county ===
H.E. Mūthomi Njūkì serves as the Governor of Tharaka Nithi County after winning the 2017 general election on 8 August.

He was later sworn in on the 18th of August 2017

=== Achievements as a Governor ===
Some of the key achievements in the first year as a Governor include:

1. Construction of the Governor's executive office block for temporary use ahead of completion of the main Governor's office.

2. Implementation of various water projects across the county that have facilitated clean water access to the residents

3. Implementation of various roads, upgrade of town roads and construction of bridges to create accessibility

4. Signing of performance contracts with the County Executive Members to ensure efficiency in delivery of services

5. Signing of Memorandums of Understanding with various institutions such as Kenya Literature Bureau to collaborate and partner in various engagements to offer service delivery to the county residents

6. Ongoing construction of various institution blocks to aid in improvement of services. They include; ECDE classes, Stadiums, Agriculture Institutions etc.

7. Ongoing expansion of county referral hospital and modernization of the hospital structure and equipment. The hospital has also automated the information management system to create efficiency

8. Electrification of various markets and villages to ensure we light up the county
