= List of counties of Kenya by fertility rate =

Fertility rate in Kenya

Fertility rates in Kenya by county

Fertility rates vary considerably across the 47 counties of Kenya as a result of differences in socioeconomic conditions, educational attainment and access to family planning services. According to the 2025–26 Kenya Mini Demographic and Health Survey Kenya had a national total fertility rate of 3.1 children per woman with Mandera recordinh the highest fertility rate at 6.8 children per woman, followed by Wajir (5.8), Tana River (5.7) and Turkana (5.6). Meanwhile, Embu had the lowest rate at 2.2, followed by Kiambu and Mombasa at 2.3 each, while Kericho and Nairobi recorded 2.6 each. Fertility rates also vary by region generally with northern and northeastern Kenya having higher fertility rates while Mount Kenya region and other major urban centres record lower fertility rates.

== List ==
Total fertility rate (TFR) by county in Kenya (2025–26)
Rank	County	TFR
#	Kenya	3.1
1	Mandera	6.8
2	Wajir	5.8
3	Tana River	5.7
4	Turkana	5.6
5	Garissa	5.3
6	West Pokot	5.1
7	Samburu	5.0
8	Marsabit	4.9
9	Baringo	4.3
10	Migori	3.8
10	Nyandarua	3.8
12	Laikipia	3.7
13	Bungoma	3.6
13	Busia	3.6
13	Isiolo	3.6
13	Kajiado	3.6
13	Lamu	3.6
18	Kakamega	3.5
18	Nakuru	3.5
18	Vihiga	3.5
21	Bomet	3.4
21	Kwale	3.4
21	Murang'a	3.4
21	Nandi	3.4
25	Homa Bay	3.3
25	Makueni	3.3
27	Kisumu	3.2
27	Machakos	3.2
27	Narok	3.2
27	Nyamira	3.2
27	Taita-Taveta	3.2
32	Kilifi	3.0
32	Trans Nzoia	3.0
32	Uasin Gishu	3.0
35	Elgeyo-Marakwet	2.9
35	Kisii	2.9
35	Siaya	2.9
38	Kitui	2.8
38	Meru	2.8
38	Nyeri	2.8
41	Kirinyaga	2.7
41	Tharaka-Nithi	2.7
43	Kericho	2.6
43	Nairobi	2.6
45	Kiambu	2.3
45	Mombasa	2.3
47	Embu	2.2
