= List of counties of Kenya by poverty rate =

This is a list of the counties of Kenya by poverty rate, as of 2015. The international poverty rate used by the World Bank is used in the following list. The estimates can therefore differ from other estimates, like the national poverty rate.

Poverty is a significant problem in Kenya. According to estimates by Oxfam, the richest 0.1 percent in Kenya own more wealth than the bottom 99.9%. Around 40 percent of the population still lived in extreme poverty in 2021.

== List ==
Percent of population living on less than $2.15, $3.65 and $6.85 a day, international dollars (2017 PPP) as per the World Bank.

Percent of population living on less than poverty thresholds
County	$2.15	$3.65	$6.85	Year of estimate
Samburu	72.9%	87.6%	95.7%	2015
Turkana	68.7%	83.6%	92.5%	2015
Mandera	64.0%	88.4%	97.8%	2015
Busia	63.0%	89.4%	97.6%	2015
West Pokot	59.0%	87.3%	99.0%	2015
Bomet	55.0%	89.5%	98.1%	2015
Marsabit	50.8%	80.0%	95.0%	2015
Garissa	46.3%	77.9%	95.1%	2015
Kisii	45.8%	81.3%	95.1%	2015
Tana River	43.2%	74.1%	93.1%	2015
Laikipia	42.2%	71.6%	89.5%	2015
Kitui	41.2%	72.4%	94.2%	2015
Wajir	40.0%	84.4%	98.5%	2015
Elgeyo-Marakwet	38.9%	75.4%	92.5%	2015
Migori	38.0%	78.2%	96.7%	2015
Bungoma	36.5%	75.1%	94.7%	2015
Kwale	35.9%	68.0%	90.6%	2015
Trans-Nzoia	35.3%	67.0%	90.6%	2015
Kakamega	34.7%	74.4%	93.8%	2015
Kilifi	34.4%	63.1%	83.2%	2015
Nandi	34.1%	69.7%	95.9%	2015
Uasin Gishu	34.1%	59.8%	89.0%	2015
Baringo	33.3%	63.9%	89.7%	2015
Siaya	31.0%	68.6%	92.4%	2015
Homa Bay	30.5%	65.0%	93.9%	2015
Nyandarua	30.4%	64.6%	90.1%	2015
Vihiga	28.8%	71.7%	94.1%	2015
Nyamira	28.8%	64.8%	91.8%	2015
Kajiado	27.9%	50.7%	77.0%	2015
Makueni	26.6%	58.2%	89.5%	2015
Nakuru	26.0%	56.9%	84.6%	2015
Narok	25.0%	51.6%	86.3%	2015
Kericho	23.9%	65.9%	91.6%	2015
Embu	23.9%	56.4%	87.6%	2015
Murang'a	23.5%	60.4%	88.3%	2015
Kenya	23.4%	59.6%	85.7%	2015
Isiolo	23.1%	66.0%	90.2%	2015
Taita-Taveta	22.3%	57.9%	82.8%	2015
Lamu	22.3%	49.6%	84.5%	2015
Kisumu	19.2%	51.7%	85.0%	2015
Meru	17.8%	55.6%	87.8%	2015
Tharaka-Nithi	17.1%	54.3%	86.2%	2015
Machakos	15.2%	41.6%	76.7%	2015
Kirinyaga	15.0%	49.8%	84.7%	2015
Kiambu	13.3%	37.1%	77.6%	2015
Nyeri	10.5%	42.1%	76.4%	2015
Mombasa	7.7%	27.7%	63.4%	2015
Nairobi City	2.3%	17.0%	57.3%	2015
