= List of counties of Kenya by area =

Density in Kenya by County

The List of counties of Kenya ranks the 47 counties of Kenya by total area and density as of 2019 Census. The 47 counties have a combined total area of 591,971 km², including 580,609 km² of land and 11,362 km² of water. Marsabit is the largest county with a total area of 76,031 km², followed by Turkana at 70,586 km² and Wajir at 56,649 km². Mombasa is the smallest county by area at 216 km², followed by Vihiga at 563 km² and Nairobi at 707 km². Population is mainly concentrated in the southwestern quadrant, particularly around the Lake Victoria area, the Kenya highlands eg the Mount Kenya region, the Central Rift Valley and the Nairobi metropolitan area, while Northern Kenya is sparsely populated due to harsh climatic conditions and insecurity. Nairobi has the highest population density at 6,247 people per km², followed by Mombasa at 5,495 and Vihiga at 1,047, while Marsabit has the lowest density at 6 people per km², followed by Tana River at 8 and Isiolo at 11.

== List ==
List of Kenyan counties by total area
Rank	County	Total area (km²)	Share of Kenya (%)	Land area (km²)	Water (%)	Population density (per km²)	Population (2019)
Total		591,971	97.04	580,609	1.92	82	47,564,296
1	Marsabit	76,031	12.46	71,905	5.43	6	459,785
2	Turkana	70,586	11.57	68,307	3.23	14	926,976
3	Wajir	56,649	9.29	56,649	0.00	14	781,263
4	Garissa	43,591	7.15	43,591	0.00	19	841,353
5	Tana River	39,153	6.42	39,153	0.00	8	315,943
6	Kitui	30,437	4.99	30,437	0.00	37	1,136,187
7	Mandera	25,986	4.26	25,986	0.00	33	867,457
8	Isiolo	25,382	4.16	25,382	0.00	11	268,002
9	Kajiado	21,899	3.59	21,783	0.53	51	1,117,840
10	Samburu	21,024	3.45	21,024	0.00	15	310,327
11	Narok	17,943	2.94	17,943	0.00	65	1,157,873
12	Taita/Taveta	17,120	2.81	17,090	0.18	20	340,671
13	Kilifi	12,505	2.05	12,396	0.87	116	1,453,787
14	Baringo	10,912	1.79	10,717	1.79	61	666,763
15	Laikipia	9,544	1.56	9,544	0.00	54	518,560
16	West Pokot	9,108	1.49	9,108	0.00	68	621,241
17	Kwale	8,230	1.35	8,165	0.79	105	866,820
18	Makueni	8,172	1.34	8,172	0.00	121	987,653
19	Nakuru	7,489	1.23	7,287	2.70	290	2,162,202
20	Meru	7,057	1.16	7,057	0.00	221	1,545,714
21	Lamu	6,140	1.01	5,832	5.02	23	143,920
22	Machakos	6,016	0.99	6,016	0.00	235	1,421,932
23	Homa Bay	4,760	0.78	2,696	43.36	359	1,131,950
24	Siaya	3,542	0.58	2,453	30.75	393	993,183
25	Uasin Gishu	3,407	0.56	3,407	0.00	343	1,163,186
26	Nyeri	3,336	0.55	3,336	0.00	228	759,164
27	Nyandarua	3,270	0.54	3,267	0.09	194	638,289
28	Migori	3,165	0.52	3,165	0.00	427	1,116,436
29	Bungoma	3,033	0.50	3,033	0.00	552	1,670,570
30	Kakamega	3,023	0.50	3,023	0.00	618	1,867,579
31	Elgeyo/Marakwet	3,018	0.49	3,018	0.00	150	454,480
32	Nandi	2,847	0.47	2,847	0.00	310	885,711
33	Embu	2,828	0.46	2,828	0.00	216	608,599
34	Kisumu	2,677	0.44	2,110	21.18	554	1,155,574
35	Kericho	2,617	0.43	2,617	0.00	370	901,777
36	Kiambu	2,569	0.42	2,569	0.00	952	2,417,735
37	Murang'a	2,527	0.41	2,527	0.00	419	1,056,640
38	Tharaka-Nithi	2,514	0.41	2,514	0.00	153	393,177
39	Trans Nzoia	2,496	0.41	2,496	0.00	397	990,341
40	Bomet	2,355	0.39	2,355	0.00	346	875,689
41	Busia	1,830	0.30	1,686	7.87	527	893,681
42	Kirinyaga	1,475	0.24	1,475	0.00	413	610,411
43	Kisii	1,321	0.22	1,321	0.00	958	1,266,860
44	Nyamira	901	0.15	901	0.00	675	605,576
45	Nairobi	707	0.12	707	0.00	6,247	4,397,073
46	Vihiga	563	0.09	563	0.00	1,047	590,013
47	Mombasa	216	0.04	151	30.09	5,495	1,208,333
