= Godana Doyo =

Kenyan politician

Hon Godana Doyo

Governor (Isiolo County)
- In office 2013–2017
- Preceded by: position established
- Succeeded by: Mohammed Kuti
- Constituency: Isiolo North

Personal details
- Born: 1 January 1970 (age 56)
- Party: Jubilee Party
- Education: University of Nairobi

Godana Doyo is a Kenyan politician who was the first Governor of Isiolo County from 2013 to 2017, elected as a member of the United Republican Party (before it joined the Jubilee Party). He was defeated in his re-election bid, this time as a member of the Party of Development and Reforms, by Mohammed Kuti. In 2017 Doyo was charged with abuse of office in a case filed by the Ethics and Anti-Corruption Commission.
