= Mzalendo Kibunjia =

Kenyan archeologist

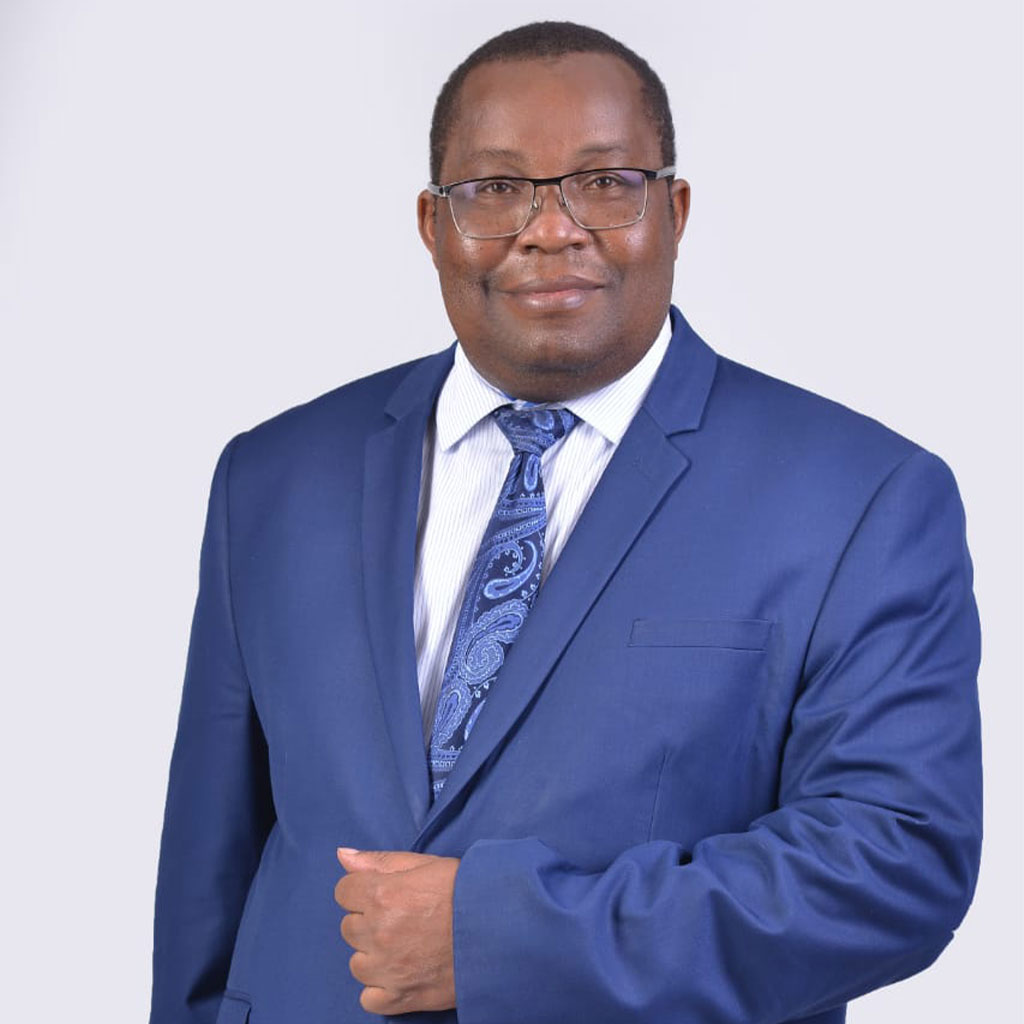
- Born: 1962 (age 63–64); Tharaka-Nithi County
- Education: University of Nairobi; Rutgers University
- Occupations: Research Scientist, Ethnoarchaeology and Anthropology
- Years active: 1988 — present
- Title: Director General, National Museums of Kenya; Chairperson, National Cohesion and Integration Commission

Kibunjia Nyagah Mzalendo is a Kenyan archeologist. He formerly served as the Director General of the National Museums of Kenya (NMK), a multi-disciplinary state corporation. In April 2024 he was arrested for allegedly stealing SH490 million (roughly $4 million) from the museum. He was appointed as the first chairman of the National Cohesion and Integration Commission (NCIC), a government agency intended to address and reduce inter-ethnic conflicts. In this role, he chaired the Nakuru Peace Accord between the Agikuyu and the Kalenjin communities. He was the first Kenyan to hold a doctorate in Early Stone Age Archaeology.

== Background and Education ==
Mzalendo Kibunjia was born on January 13, 1962, in Marimanti village, Tharaka-Nithi County. He attended the University of Nairobi and graduated with a B.A. in Archaeology and History. He studied at Rutgers University in the United States, obtaining an M.A. in Anthropology in 1989. His Doctor of Philosophy degree in the same field was obtained in 2002, also from Rutgers. He also pursued a Bachelor of Laws (LL.B.) at the University of Nairobi.

== Career ==
Before completing his undergraduate course he was given a scholarship to pursue a PhD at the University of Toronto, Canada. In 1984, he joined expeditions with Charles Cable who introduced him to the National Museum of Kenya (NMK) where he met and began to work with Richard Leakey. NMK organized a scholarship for Mzalendo at the University of Wisconsin, Milwaukee. The West Turkana Archaeological Project, which he co-directed with the then WTAP director Helene Roche, is still making important contributions to the knowledge and understanding of stone-tool technology in early human evolution.

He was the founding chairman of the National Cohesion and Integration Commission (NCIC), an institution that was created after the 2007–2008 post-election violence by the Kofi Annan Negotiation Team to address and reduce inter-ethnic conflicts and ensure that Kenya does not succumb to a similar situation in the future. He led the commission in the development of the Nakuru Peace Accord between the Agikuyu and Kalenjin communities.

He has held different positions at the National Museum of Kenya such as Director General, Chief Research Scientist, the Head of Sites and Monuments, Chairman Museum Enterprise and Development Unit Committee, Chairman Ol Ari Nyiro, UNESCO World Heritage Site List Nomination Committee, and Chairman National Environment Management Authority, and Technical Advisory Committee on the proposed Olkaria Geothermal Power Plant. He is a Technical Advisor to the Kenyan delegation to the UNESCO World Heritage Committee, and State Party meetings and has also offered expertise in the development of Africa Insider Mediators Platform, IGAD Mediation Unit, Djibouti and national cohesion and integration training manual.

== Bibliography ==
Mzalendo's published works is among many articles on Old Stone Age tool technology and other scientific projects such as:

- Koobi Fora Field & Training Program in Paleoanthropology.
- West Turkana Archaeological Research Project.
- Swahili Studies and Coastal Peoples of Kenya field school.
- Early hominin foot morphology based on 1.5 million-year-old Footprints from Ileret Kenya.
- First occurrence of early Homo in the Nachukui Formation (West Turkana, Kenya)
