= Tharaka-Nithi District =

Former district of Kenya

Coordinates: 0°18′S 38°0′E

Tharaka-Nithi District was one of the districts of Kenya located in that country's Eastern Province from 1992 to 1998. Its former boundaries now corresponds to those of Tharaka-Nithi County.

As of the 2009 census Tharaka-Nithi District had an area of 1570 km² and a population of 365,330 (2009 census)

Tharaka-Nithi District was created in 1992 from the larger Meru District. In 1998, the Tharaka-Nithi District was split into two districts, Nithi (Meru South District) and Tharaka, but a 2009 High Court decision declared that split unconstitutional and re-combined the two.

From 1998 until 2009 the district headquarters for Tharaka District were at Marimanti (Tharaka); it had one local authority, Tharaka district council. and one constituency: Tharaka Constituency. The district was divided into three administrative divisions:

Administrative divisions
Division	Population*	Headquarters
Central Tharaka	38,914	Marimanti
North Tharaka	36,904	Gatunga
South Tharaka	25,174	Chiakariga
Total	100,992	-
* 1999 census. Sources: , ,
