= Francis Kagwima =

Kenyan politician

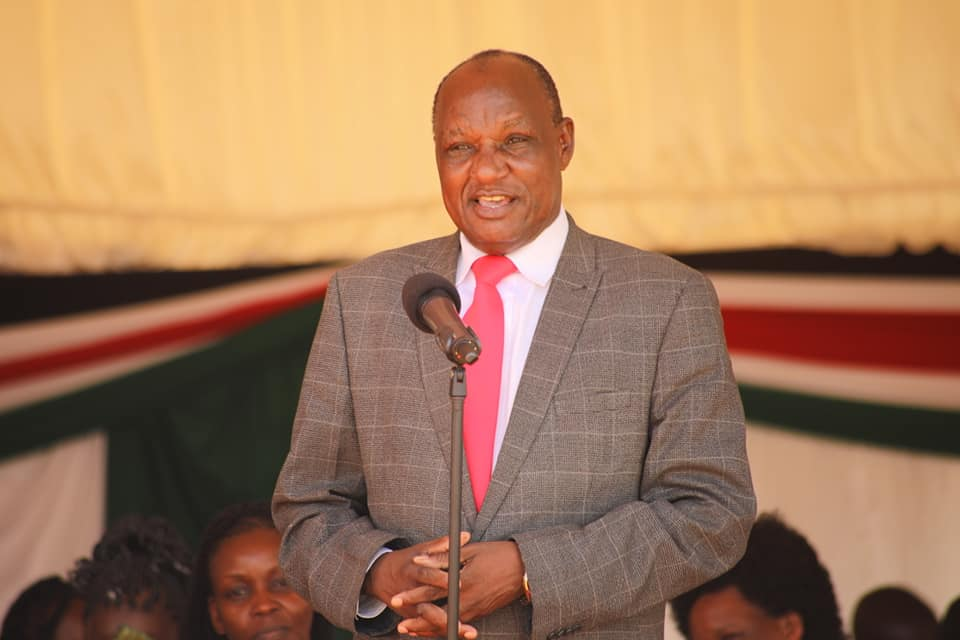
- Born: 1952 (age 73–74)
- Education: Bsc. Mechanical engineering
- Alma mater: Nairobi University
- Occupation: Politician
- Political party: Jubilee party

Francis Nyamu Kagwima (born 1952) is a Kenyan politician. He is the second and incumbent deputy governor of Tharaka Nithi County in Kenya after having been cleared on a Jubilee Party ticket in the Kenyan election as Onesmus Muthomi Njuki's running mate. Before being elected, he served as the member of Parliament for Tharaka Constituency from 1988 to 1997 and was re-elected for the 2002–2007 term.

== Education background ==
After completing his early education, he joined Tharaka Boys from 1969–1970, did KJSE and later joined Nkubu High School from 1971–1974 for his O level and A level. He joined Nairobi University in 1975 where he pursued his Bachelor of Science in mechanical engineering.

He graduated in 1978 with Upper Class Honours.

== Career life ==
After graduating from University he joined KPCU as an Engineer trainee and rose quickly to the rank of Chief Engineer until he resigned to join politics in 1988.

He was elected as a Member of Parliament for Tharaka Constituency in 1988.

In his second term he was an Assistant Minister in Research, Technical Training & Technology from 1993–1997.
