= Tharaka University =

Public university in Kenya

Tharaka University (TUN)
- Motto: "Empowering Society for Better Life"
- Type: Public
- Established: 2015; 11 years ago
- Chancellor: Ratemo Michieka
- Vice-Chancellor: Peter K. Muriungi
- Students: ~7,000 (2024)
- Location: Gatunga, Kenya; 00°05′36″S 37°59′20″E
- Campus: Rural
- Website: Homepage
- Location in Kenya

Tharaka University (TUN) is a public university in Kenya.

== Location ==
The main campus of the university is located adjacent to the town of Gatunga, in Tharaka South Sub-county, in Tharaka Nithi County, on the eastern slopes of Mount Kenya in Central Kenya. Gatunga is located approximately 231 kilometres (144 mi), northeast of the city of Nairobi, the national capital.

== History ==
Tharaka University was established in 2015 as a campus of Chuka University. In 2017 the campus was elevated to a constituent college of the same university, under the name "Tharaka University College". In 2022, Uhuru Kenyatta, the country's head of state, granted Tharaka University, a university charter.

== Academics ==
As of June 2026, Tharaka University has the faculties listed below. Courses are offered at certificate, diploma, bachelors, masters and doctorate degree levels.

- Faculty of Physical Sciences, Engineering and Technology
- Faculty of Life Sciences and Natural Resources
- Faculty of Business Studies
- Faculty of Education
- Faculty of Humanities and Social Sciences

== See also ==
- List of universities in Kenya
