= Meru North District =

Former district of Kenya

Coordinates: 0°10′N 37°45′E

Meru North District (also occasionally referred to as Nyambene District) was an unconstitutionally created district of Kenya, located in that country's Eastern Province. In 1992, it was split from Meru District, along with Meru Central District, Meru South District (Nithi), and Tharaka District. Since the High Court's decision in September 2009, the territory of Meru North has been part of Meru County.

The area of Meru North District is home to the Ameru people, who are sometimes described as being related to other tribes living in the Mount Kenya region: the Kikuyu and Embu. The people are now predominantly Christian — Methodist, Presbyterian, Roman Catholic, and other denominations, reflecting the work of missionaries. There are minorities of Indian descent, who are mainly Hindus, and Arab descent, who are Muslims. There are also some resident Europeans, who are predominantly British in ancestry.

Meru is well known for its production of khat, known locally as miraa, which it supplies to the rest of the country's major towns. Because of the rich soils in the area, khat thrives and most of the residents benefit from its sale. Trading in this commodity is a boon to other vendors, for example it stimulates the sale of banana leaves to khat traders to protect the harvest from drying.

== Local authorities ==
Authority	Type	Population*	Urban pop.*
Maua	Municipality	40,820	9,763
Nyambene	County	563,230	2,139
Total	-	604,050	11,902
* 1999 census.

== Administrative divisions ==
Division	Population*	Urban pop.*	Headquarters
Akithi	43,096	0	
Igembe Central	41,944	8,739	Maua
Igembe East	28,575	0	
Igembe North	58,046	0	
Igembe South	18,209	0	
Igembe S/East	18,700	0	
Igembe S/West	21,791	0	
Laare	65,428	1,895	Lare
Mutuati	56,751	0	Mutuati
Ndoleli	54,730	0	
Tigania Central	45,061	0	
Tigania East	30,944	0	
Tigania North	49,098	0	
Tigania West	32,266	0	
Uringu	39,003	0	
Total	604,050	10,634	-
* 1999 census

The district headquarters was in the town of Maua. There were four constituencies in the district:

- Igembe South Constituency
- Igembe North Constituency
- Tigania East Constituency
- Tigania West Constituency
