= Joseph Lomwa =

Kenyan politician

Joseph Samal Lomwa is a Kenyan politician and a member of the 11th Kenyan parliament elected from Isiolo North Constituency on the ticket of United Republican Party (URP) in 2013. He succeeded Mohammed Kuti of the Kenya African National Union (KANU) and Narc-K party. In the parliament, Lomwa served on Public Works, Roads & Transport committee. He did not run for reelection in 2017 as he failed to secure the endorsement of his clan's council of elders.
