= Chogoria =

Town in Kenya

Coordinates: 0.229541°S 37.627325°E

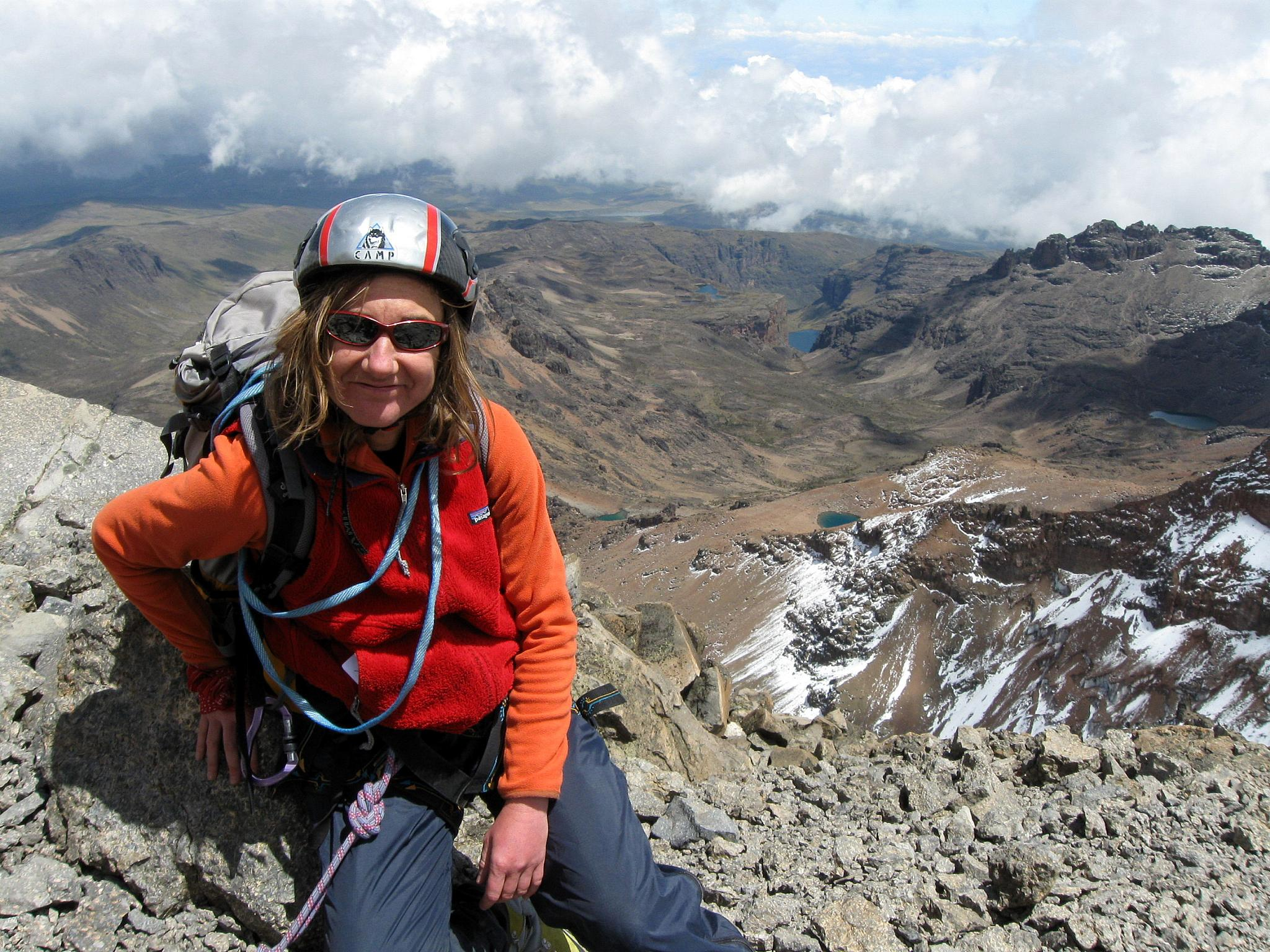
Looking towards the Chogoria valley from high on Nelion, Mount Kenya.

Chogoria is a town located in Mwimbi Division of Tharaka-Nithi County of Kenya. It is located approximately 97 miles (about 186 km) from Nairobi. It is connected to the rest of the country by an all-weather, tarmacked road, the Meru-Nairobi Highway. The closest town to Chogoria is Chuka. Other nearby towns are Igoji, Nkubu, Meru and Embu. The town has an urban population of 28,415 and a rural population of 3,208.

== Infrastructure ==
Chogoria Hospital, founded by Rev. Dr. Clive Irvine in 1922, is a primary healthcare resource for over 350,000 people in the Meru District. It provides maternal and infant care, encompasses a wide network of outpatient clinics, and coordinates youth education programs.

The Clive Irvine College of Health Sciences provides primarily nursing education to over 300 students annually.

Chogoria is on the widely used hiking trail towards Mount Kenya.
