= Clive Irvine =

Scottish medical missionary (1893–1974)

Archibald Clive Irvine (January 1893 – 1974) was a Scottish medical missionary to Kenya. He was an early proponent of stopping female circumcision. He worked primarily in Chogoria, Kenya, where he introduced coffee cultivation. He founded the PCEA Chogoria Hospital and is the namesake of the Clive Irvine College of Health Sciences on the slopes of Mount Kenya. Clive also started the Chogoria Girls and Boys schools.

== Early life and education ==
Archibald Clive Irvine was born in January 1893 in Liverpool, Lancashire, England, to John Archibald Irvine and Annie Mary White. He was the oldest of six children, with three sisters and two brothers. His father was a Presbyterian minister.

After graduating with a degree in arts and medicine and surgery from Aberdeen University, Irvine joined the military as a medical officer. He was a Royal Army Medical Corps captain in German East Africa during the First World War from 1917 to 1919. He often corresponded with African porters from Uganda and Kenya, gaining knowledge of "native" medicine and fluency in Swahili and Kikuyu.

== Career ==
In 1915, the Church of Scotland Mission (CSM) had built a mission station in Chuka with the guidance of John W. Arthur and had plans to evangelize the Chuka-Mwimbi area. During Irvine's time in the war, he met Arthur, who invited him to join the CSM. In 1919, Irvine rehashed interest in bringing Christianity to the Kikuyu and surrounding areas. He offered to work as a medical missionary for the Kikuyu mission and was posted to Tumutumu mission station.

Irvine joined the CSM station at Tumutumu in July 1919.

=== Chogoria ===
He was appointed to set up the Chogoria mission station and arrived on 12 October 1922. Carr and Arthur found Chogoria a suitable site near Mount Kenya, which is relatively central, with a waterfall to provide irrigation and hydroelectricity. On 12 October 1922, Irvine arrived with his wife and newborn son. For help, he had three teachers from Kikuyu, native assistants, and many from local villages eager to be paid for work.

In 1922, Irvine set up a mission hospital, now Presbyterian Church of East Africa (PCEA) Chogoria Hospital.

Irvine treated the major diseases of yaws, leprosy, and tuberculosis. Within two years of its inception, Irvine treated 11,000 outpatients. He regularly detailed his life in his 'Chogoria Days' articles published in Kikuyu News.

Irvine focused on treating yaws, an illness he believed almost fifty percent of the population had. He routinely treated distant villages with mobile dispensaries. The medical staff in Chogoria contributed to its eradication in the area. In addition, he gained support from the Mwimbi by taming the problem of bush pig attacks on farmland by poisoning them with strychnine. Athletics were also used to attract locals, holding sports days with events like the needle threading race.

Irvine often ministered to the Mwimbi people through public prayers, hymns, sermons, and lessons. He would also baptize. In 1933, he was officially ordained.

=== Conflicts ===
The spread of Christianity in the Chuka-Mwimbi area frequently came into conflict with the native beliefs of the area. Irvine outwardly opposed and competed with the local healers by targeting their specialties treatments, such as foot and leg problems. Irvine often butted heads with the Njuri-Ncheke based on religion. Although a membership in the Njuri meant a high social rank, he would not allow a Christian convert to join. He considered it pagan and a threat to his teachings and Christian beliefs.

From 1928 to 1932, there was major opposition to female circumcision or female genital mutilation (FGM) from the British missions, especially from the Church of Scotland. Arthur led this, which ultimately led to him being denounced by the Kikuyu Central Association and losing the political backing of the natives.

In 1947, Irvine stated that the Church would accept a hundred unexcised women. While the schools did not expel excised girls, he publicized that not all the top girls were excised. It was said that in the 50s, the students were examined to determine if they had been excised; if they were, they were separated from the others and shamed.

== Personal life and death ==
In 1921, Irvine married Margaret Joyce Carr, daughter of wealthy contractor and sponsor of the Church of Scotland Mission (CSM), Ernest Carr, in Nairobi, Kenya. She gave birth to their first child, Austin John Anthony, the following year in Chogoria. They later had two more children, both born and raised in Chogoria. One son followed his father's footsteps and became a medical missionary in Chogoria.

Irvine retired from his medical work in 1961 but continued to minister, teach, and develop Chogoria until the end of his life. He died in Nairobi in 1974.

== Legacy ==
The PCEA Chogoria Hospital, founded by Irvine, is currently (2024) considered the largest mission hospital in Kenya. The mission hospital had 120 beds by his death, including outpatients, maternity, men's, and women's wards. In the 1970s, the hospital was passed from the Church of Scotland to the PCEA and was rebuilt to have 295 beds.

Honoring Irvine, the Clive Irvine College of Health Sciences is named after him. The dormitories were rebuilt in 2021 with a grant from USAID. There were over 300 enrolled students at that time.

The boys' and girls' schools that Irvine founded are currently the Chogoria Girls High School and the Chogoria Boys High School. The two schools shared classrooms from 1953 and briefly merged from 1965 to 1968. They now operate separately as national boarding schools in Kenya.

Irvine was the mentor for Jerusha Kanyua, whom the PCEA proclaimed a saint.

Irvine also significantly impacted the agriculture of the Tharaka-Nithi County by initiating the coffee cultivation in Chogoria.

== Sources ==
- Fadiman, Jeffrey (1993). When We Began, There Were Witchmen: An Oral History from Mount Kenya. Berkeley: University of California Press. ISBN 978-0-520-06507-9. OCLC 43476568.
