= John Paul Mwirigi =

Kenyan politician

Honorable John Paul Mwirigi
- Born: 7 January 1994 (age 32); Meru County, Kenya
- Education: Mount Kenya University; Bachelor of Education (Arts)
- Occupation: Politician
- Years active: 2017 — present
- Organisation: Parliament of Kenya
- Known for: The youngest elected MP in Kenya on an independent ticket.
- Title: Member of parliament for Igembe South Constituency; Meru County, Kenya
- Predecessor: Franklin Linturi
- Political party: UDA (since 2022)

John Paul Mwirigi (born 7 January 1994) is the Member of Parliament for Igembe South Constituency, Meru County, in the Kenya National Assembly. He was elected in August 2017 at the age of 23 years, the youngest ever Kenyan member of parliament. He was re-elected on 9 August 2022 as Igembe South Constituency MP with a total of 34,561 votes. His closest opponent garnered 10,000 votes.

== Background and education ==
Mwirigi was born on 7 January 1994 in Igembe South Constituency, Meru County. He is the sixth-born in a family of eight siblings. His family had modest means, but they could afford decent meals, according to his testimony. His father died in 2014, but his mother was still alive, at the time Mwirigi was elected to parliament in 2017.

He attended Riaki Primary School and later Kirindine Day Secondary School, where he obtained his High School Diploma. He was admitted to Mount Kenya University, to pursue a Bachelor of Education(Arts) degree, specializing in History and Kiswahili. He was pursuing the degree as a part-time student, since he had to work to raise his tuition and upkeep. At the time he was elected to parliament, he was in his third year at the university.

== Work experience ==
Prior to his political career, he worked as a labourer at Igembe Tea Factory, carrying logs for KSh350 (US$3.50) a day. Sometimes he worked at a timber yard owned by a friend, carrying logs there as well.

== Political career ==
Beginning at age 19 years, while still in high school, he began to entertain the idea of becoming a member of the National Assembly of Kenya. His close friends encouraged him to pursue his dream. However, many others, including close family members tried to dissuade him from trying.

The odds were stacked against him; he was too young, he did not belong to a political party and therefore lacked a ground political machine, he had no money and he had zero political experience.

He stood as an independent candidate. This, according to him, ensured that his name would be on the ballot on election day. He feared that if he joined a political party, he would be rigged out of the primaries, due to lack of finances.

He carried out a grassroots campaign, canvassing his constituency door-to-door, mainly on foot. Most of the resources used in the campaign were donated by well-wishers, according to Mwirigi. He won, beating his nearest opponent by over 3,000 votes and garnering 76 percent of the total.
