= Presbyterian Church of East Africa =

Religious organization in East Africa

- Classification: Protestant
- Orientation: Presbyterian
- Theology: Reformed
- Governance: Presbyterian
- Moderator: Rt. Rev. Thegu Mutahi
- Associations: World Communion of Reformed Churches, World Council of Churches, National Council of Churches
- Region: East Africa
- Founder: Thomas Watson
- Origin: 1891; Kenya
- Branched from: Church of Scotland
- Congregations: 1,000 and 310 parishes and hundreds of house fellowships
- Members: 4,000,000
- Primary schools: dozens
- Secondary schools: dozens

Presbyterian Church of East Africa (PCEA) is a Presbyterian denomination headquartered in Nairobi, Kenya. In Kenya, 10% of the population is Presbyterian. It was started by missionaries from Scotland, most notable of whom was Dr John Arthur. It has its headquarters in Nairobi South C.

== History ==
=== Beginning ===
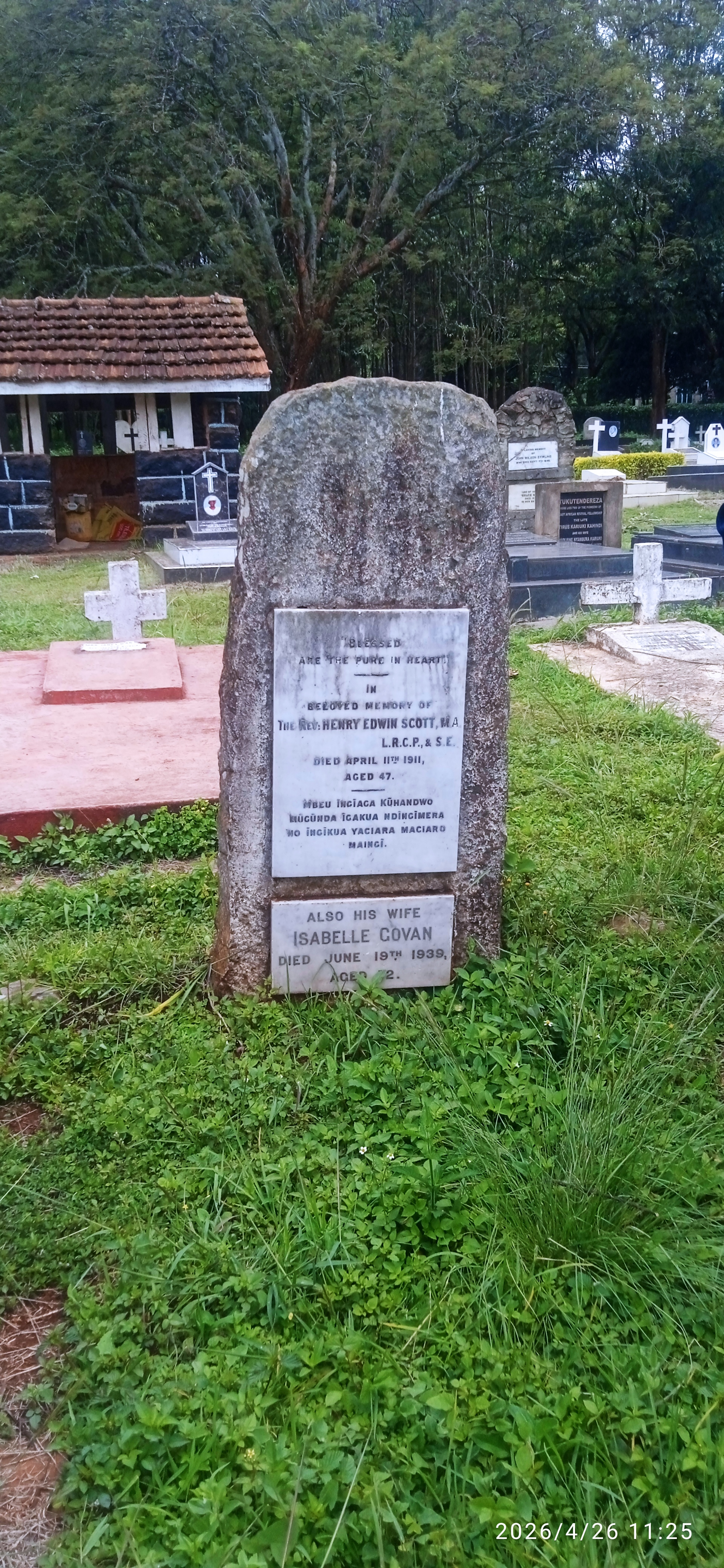
Graves of religious leaders of the Presbyterian Thogoto church

The story of the Presbyterian Church of East Africa (PCEA) begins with a business company, when in 1889 Sir William Mackinnon and Mr. Alexander Low Bruce, made private plans for a Scottish Mission among the Kamba and Maasai and later to the Kikuyu people. In 1891, at the invitation of the late Sir William Mackinnon, Mr. A.L. Bruce and other directors of the Imperial British East Africa Company, a band of Missionaries left London for British East Africa. These were Mr. Thomas Watson, Evangelist Mr. John Greig, Mr. John Linton, Mr. C.M.A Rahman and were met at Mombasa by Dr. Moffat. The party was later in the year joined by Dr. James Stewart of Lovedale, South Africa, who became the leader of the Mission. These missionaries arrived in Kibwezi in October of the same year and established a mission under the name of the "East African Scottish Mission". In 1892, the first temporary Church at Kibwezi was opened by Dr. James Stewart, and also the first School with two pupils.

In 1893 mission work was strengthened by the arrival of Mr. John Paterson who introduced basic agriculture and the first coffee seeds.

Owing to the infestation of Kibwezi by Malaria and the subsequent loss of life of Missionaries, Mr. Thomas Watson visited Dagoretti in 1894 to explore possibilities of transferring the mission station. In 1898 the missionaries moved from Kibwezi to Dagoretti where they constituted themselves as the "Church of Scotland Mission" (CMS). In 1900 Watson died of pneumonia at Kikuyu. Other notable CSM missionaries of this period include Revd Dr John Arthur, who worked with the Alliance of Protestant Missions.

=== Formation ===
When the mission was handed over to the Church of Scotland, it found believers among the Kikuyu people through the work of its stations at Kikuyu and Tumutumu (1908) and among the Meru people in Chuka, and Mwimbi, and among the people of Imenti through its work at Chogoria (1915).

In 1920, by the authority of the General Assembly of the Church of Scotland of 1918, a form of Church government was set up and inaugurated by Very Reverend J.N. Ogilvie, Elders ordained, Parish Sessions formed for the Congregations of Kikuyu, Tumutumu and St. Andrew's, Nairobi and the Presbytery of British East Africa instituted, to exercise jurisdiction over these Congregations. In the same year (1920) ordination of the first native elders took place in Kikuyu. It was not until 1926 when the ordination of the First African Pastors took place namely, the Rev. Musa Gitau, the Rev. Benjamin Githieya and the Rev. Joshua Matenjwa, at Kikuyu.

The church expanded to Chogoria in 1922 when Dr. Clive Irvine set up the first mission station, then hospital and schools there.

=== Mergers ===
In 1936 the separation of the overseas Presbytery of Kenya to cater to the colonial and continental work was done by the General Assembly of the Church of Scotland. In 1946 the Gospel Missionary Society (GMS), an American-oriented Church based at Kambui in Kiambu, joined the overseas Presbytery of Kenya. In 1952 authority was given to the overseas Presbytery of Kenya by the general assembly of the Church of Scotland to begin a conversation with the synod of Presbyterian Church of East Africa with a view to seeking a basis for uniting the Presbyterian work in East Africa in one Church. In 1956 the Synod of the Presbyterian Church of East Africa and the overseas Presbytery of Kenya declared the Congregations over which they had several jurisdictions united as one Church whose constitution was then adopted.

== Statistics ==
The Presbyterian Church in Eastern Africa has approximately 4,000,000 members, over 1,000 congregations and 313 parishes and hundreds of house fellowships. The denomination has currently 61 presbyteries, divided into 5 regions, these are the Eastern Region, Central region, Nairobi region, Mt. Kenya Region and Rift Valley Region.

In Tanzania there are approximately two Presbyterian churches in Eastern Africa Presbyteries. The denomination began to work in Tanzania in 1950.

== Theology ==
- Apostles' Creed
- Nicene Creed
- Westminster Confession of Faith

== Structure ==
At the local level, there is a congregation. The congregation is governed by the session. The middle governing body is the presbytery. The highest court is the General Assembly. The church does not have Synods.

== Christian Ministry partners ==
- PC(USA)
- Presbyterian Church in Ireland
- Church of Scotland
- United Church of Canada
- Presbyterian Church in Canada
- Presbyterian Church of Korea (TongHap)
- Mission Africa
