= Igembe South Constituency =

Kenyan electoral constituency

Igembe South
- constituency for the Parliament of Kenya
- Igembe South Constituency within Meru County

- Meru County within Kenya
- County: Meru
- Population: 161,646
- Area: 255 km^{2} (98.5 sq mi)

Current constituency
- Number of members: 1
- Party: UDA
- Member of Parliament: John Paul Mwirigi
- Wards: 5

Igembe South Constituency is an electoral constituency in Kenya. It is one of nine constituencies of Meru County. The constituency was established for the 1988 elections. It was known as Igembe Constituency before the 2007 elections.

It was one of four constituencies of the former Meru North District.

== Members of Parliament ==
Elections	MP	Party	Notes
1969	Joseph Muturia	KANU	
1974	Jackson Kalweo M'Itirithia	KANU	
1979	Jackson Kalweo M'Itirithia	KANU	
1988	Joseph Mwenda Malebe	KANU	One-party system.
1992	Jackson Itirithia Kalweo	KANU	
1997	Jackson Itirithia Kalweo	KANU	
2002	Raphael Muriungi	NARC	
2007	Franklin Linturi	KANU	
2013	Franklin Linturi	Jubilee Alliance	
2017	John Paul Mwirigi	Independent	
2022	John Paul Mwirigi	UDA	

== Locations and wards ==
Locations
Location	Population*
Akachiu	8,430
Antubeiga	12,090
Antubochiu	6,210
Athi	8,218
Athiru Gaiti	9,679
Giika	4,315
Kabuline	8,216
Kangeta	10,553
Kantihiari	10,401
Kanuni	7,662
Kiegoi	7,757
Kiengu	13,680
Kiguru	6,585
Kindani	4,399
Kirimampio	8,991
Kithetu	5,295
Luluma	6.840
Makululu	10,346
Maua	15,242
Miori	9,766
Muringene	12,433
Nduguto	5,920
Nguyuyu	11,806
Njia	18,904
Nkinyanga	7,285
Total	x
1999 census.

Wards
Ward	Registered Voters	Local Authority
Giteretu / Anchenge	1,494	Meru North County
Igembe East	9,632	Meru North County
Igembe South	6,095	Meru North County
Igembe South East	5,542	Meru North County
Igembe South West	8,478	Meru North County
Kangeta	8,771	Meru North County
Kiegoi	6,009	Meru North County
Njia	9,879	Meru North County
Mailo Tatu	2,175	Maua municipality
Maua East	3,591	Maua municipality
Maua North	1,744	Maua municipality
Maua South	1,791	Maua municipality
Stadium	3,758	Maua municipality
Total	68,959	
*September 2005.
