= Nakuru County Peace Accord =

2012 peace agreement in Kenya

The Nakuru County Peace Accord (or “Rift Valley Peace Accord”) refers to the peace agreement signed on 19 August 2012 between elders of the Agikuyu (see also Kikuyu) and Kalenjin communities as well as other ethnic groups of Kenya.

The agreement was signed following a 16-month-long peace process led by the National Cohesion and Integration Commission (NCIC) to address sources of ethnic conflict and a history of violence in the rift valley region of Kenya. Nakuru County was seen as the epicenter of violence in the aftermath of the disputed 2007 Presidential Elections which left over 1,100 people dead and over 350,000 displaced nationwide.

Under the accord, the Agikuyu and Kalenjin elders signed a formal acknowledgment of past violence and antipathy between the communities, a code of conduct for communities in Nakuru County, a set of follow-up actions to be undertaken, and a commitment to dispute resolution. The accord was signed by the communities as an agreement to prevent future violence.

== Background ==
=== Ethnicity and Election Violence in Kenya ===
Kenya is populated by an estimated 42 ethnic communities primarily from the Bantu, Nilotic and Cushotic language families. Ethnic consciousness materialized and hardened under British colonial rule (c. 1895 - 1963) which endowed ethnicity as a social phenomenon with importance in the societal hierarchy. The British colonial influence left two legacies linked to ethnicity: land grievances and patronage politics.

Under British colonial policies, “white settler” populations confiscated close to 20% of Kenya's most productive farming land from local communities. This policy displaced a large number of Kenyan natives, caused an influx of immigrant laborers not previously from the highlands and led to the creation of squatter settlements.

In the first part of the 20th century, calls for freedom and land redistribution gathered momentum leading in part to the Mau Mau Uprising (1952-1960), and eventually to various land redistribution schemes by the colonial administration ahead of independence in 1963. One of these schemes, known as the million acre scheme, sought to buy large swathes of land from settlers for the purposes of settling the squatters in the region. The scheme took on an ethnic character as it reflected the makeup of Kenya's ethnic communities and especially the composition of the squatters, leading a large number of Kikuyu squatters to be settled in areas of the Rift Valley.

Following independence in 1963, elites under the Jomo Kenyatta regime used their positions to redistribute land and purchase land titles. The environment benefited elites and those with access to land cooperatives, while disadvantaging those communities without recognized communal land rights and without access to the Kenyatta regime. In part of the Rift Valley region, Kikuyu communities settled in lands formerly inhabited by other ethnic groups, namely the Kalenjin and Maasai.

Ethnic patronage politics grew in post-colonial Kenya, as the state became the main vehicle for social and economic mobility in the race for resources and access to power. This led to a system that would entrench and enrich some ethnic groups while establishing barriers to access for others. The structure of unequal access increased tensions amongst the various ethnicities; but politicized ethnic violence was largely tamed under de facto one-party rule.

However, since 1991 and the return to a multi-party democracy, old ethnic rivalries were politicized for political gain leading to ethnic violence in every election over the next two decades.

=== 2007-2008 post-election violence ===
On 30 December 2007, the Electoral Commission of Kenya announced Mwai Kibaki, of the Party of National Unity (PNU) as the winner of Kenya's Presidential elections, amidst reports by international observers that tallying and compiling of votes had been manipulated.

Initial violence seemed to be the result of a spontaneous response to the perceived election fraud, soon leading to the attacks in Orange Democratic Movement (ODM) stronghold areas (Nairobi slums, Eldoret, Kisumu, and Mombasa) against Kikuyus assumed to be PNU supporters. In the following weeks, the violence took on an ethnic dimension as politicians, businessmen, and others planned and organized the use of criminal gangs to carry out attacks. Between 27 December 2007 and 29 February 2008, 1,113 deaths were recorded by the Commission of Inquiry into Post-Election Violence, 744 of which were reported from Rift Valley province.

=== KNDR and the creation of the NCIC ===
The Kenya National Dialogue and Reconciliation (KNDR) process refers to a series of agreements brokered by the African Union Panel of Eminent African Personalities between President Mwai Kibaki and opposition candidate Raila Odinga. The Panel, led by former UN Secretary-General Kofi Annan, began formal negotiations between the principals on 29 January 2008 which would go on to discuss four agenda items:

1. Immediate actions to stop violence and restore rights/liberties;
2. Immediate measures to address the humanitarian crisis and promote reconciliation;
3. How to overcome the political crisis; and
4. Long-term issues and solutions, such as land reform, inequality, national cohesion, accountability, and constitutional reform.

On 28 February 2008, Kibaki and Odinga signed an agreement to install a transitional power-sharing government, ending the immediate political crisis and paving the way for legislation like the National Accord and Reconciliation Act (2008) and the National Cohesion and Integration Act (2008). The latter act created the National Cohesion and Integration Commission (NCIC) to undertake activities to eliminate discrimination and to further equality and peaceful coexistence of different ethnic and racial communities in Kenya.

== Nakuru Peace Process ==
Given its mandate, the NCIC decided to engage in Nakuru County to stop the cycle of violence in the Rift Valley ahead of the elections scheduled for 2013. The NCIC and NSC began formal engagement in Nakuru County in April 2011, guided by an approach that focused on the two main protagonists in conflict, the Kikuyu and Kalenjin communities. The mediation team first engaged the elders of each community, in order to gain buy-in from the more powerful and revered members of each community. The team then engaged each community separately to gauge their interests and concerns, and to prepare them for eventual bilateral discussions between the Kikuyu and Kalenjin.

Over the course of 16 months, elders from each community began to engage via working groups and an environment of understanding began to emerge after many meetings, including public apologies. Finally, toward the end of the process, the NCIC and NSC sought technical support from the Centre for Humanitarian Dialogue for the drafting of the peace agreement, which included extensive input from the communities themselves.

== Agreement and Implementation ==
As described in the accord, the purpose of the agreement was “to acknowledge the issues between our communities in Nakuru County and to take our share of responsibility for dealing with them – peacefully.” The accord was organized so as to acknowledge past violence; recognize the responsibilities of elders in each community, and to outline cooperation to prevent future violence from occurring especially around the 2013 elections. The agreement was a political commitment by the community elders to work to prevent violence in the future. As such, the process left the issue of justice and impunity to the work of the Truth, Justice and Reconciliation Commission, and the issue of land grievances to the work of the National Land Commission, a decision taken to facilitate immediate cooperation.

The agreement outlined a code of conduct for the communities, and emphasized the need for immediate follow-up actions with an emphasis on outreach and popularization of the accord. Encouraged by the NCIC, the communities conducted joint public outreach to engage the general public via joint TV appearances and roadshows as well as the provincial administration and law enforcement agencies. Moreover, the elders directly engaged 2013 election candidates for president and Deputy President, as well as for elective offices in Nakuru County. Ultimately the political endorsement of the accord contributed to the relatively peaceful elections in 2013.
