= Alex Muthengi Mwiru =

Kenyan politician

Alex Muthengi Mwiru is a Kenyan politician. He belongs to the Party of National Unity and was elected to represent the Tharaka Constituency in the National Assembly of Kenya since the 2007 Kenyan general election.
