= Isiolo North Constituency =

- Constituency
- Location of Isiolo North Constituency in Isiolo County

Area
  - Total: 15,881 km^{2} (6,132 sq mi)

Population (2009)
  - Total: 100,176
  - Density: 6.3079/km^{2} (16.337/sq mi)

Isiolo North Constituency is an electoral constituency in Kenya which was established for the 1966 elections. It is one of two constituencies of Isiolo County. The constituency has Seven wards, all electing Members of county assembly to the Isiolo County Assembly.

== Members of Parliament ==
Elections	MP	Party	Notes
1966	M’Kubito Lawi	KANU	
1969	Mohamed Abdul Kadir	KANU	One-party system
1974	Ahmed Haji Halake Fayo	KANU	One-party system
1979	Ahmed Haji Halake Fayo	KANU	One-party system
1983	Halake Fayo Hussein	KANU	By-election, One-party system.
1983	Sebastian Muthaura Kiome	KANU	One-party system.
1988	Charfano Guyo Mokku	KANU	One-party system.
1992	Charfano Guyo Mokku	KANU	
1997	Charfano Guyo Mokku	KANU	
2002	Mohammed Kuti	KANU	
2007	Mohammed Kuti	NARC-K	
2012	Joseph Lomwa Samal	URP	under the new constitution
2017	Hassan Oda Hulufo	KPP	
2022	Joseph Lomwa Samal	JP	

== Locations and wards ==
Locations
Location	Population*
Bisan Biliku	2,244
Bulesa	2,917
Isiolo West	14,734
Kipsing	2,644
Korbesa	3,520
Malkagalla	4,240
Merti	7,470
Ngare Mara	8,324
Oldonyiro	4,996
Total	x
1999 census.

Wards
Ward	Registered Voters
Wabera	11,947
Bulesa Pesa	12,530
Chari	4,322
Cherab	7,285
Ngare Mara	4,521
Burat	10,995
Oldonyiro	4,653
Total	56,253
*August 2017.
