= Merti, Kenya =

Merti
- Village
- Location in Kenya
- Coordinates: 1.06660°N 38.66660°E
- Country: Kenya
- County: Isiolo County
- Time zone: UTC+3 (EAT)

Merti is a small town in Isiolo County in northern Kenya. Merti is one of the upcoming urban centres in Isiolo County. It is also the capital of Merti sub-county, which has a population of 47,206.

Merti is located just over 140 km northeast of county capital Isiolo town, along the Ewaso Ng'iro River. Beside it is the Merti plateau
