= Maara Constituency =

Electoral constituency of Kenya

Maara
- constituency for the Parliament of Kenya
- Maara Constituency within Tharaka-Nithi County

- Tharaka-Nithi County within Kenya
- County: Tharaka-Nithi
- Population: 114,894
- Area: 266 km^{2} (102.7 sq mi)

Current constituency
- Number of members: 1
- Party: UDA
- Member of Parliament: Japhet Miriti Kareke Mbiuki
- Wards: 5

Maara is one of the three constituencies of Tharaka-Nithi County in Kenya.
