= Rehema Jaldesa =

Kenyan politician

Rehema Dida Jaldesa

Personal details
- Born: 29 July 1971 (age 54) Isiolo, Kenya
- Party: Jubilee Party (2013–present)

Rehema Dida Jaldesa (born 29 July 1971) is a Kenyan politician. She is the current Chief Administrative Secretary tourism, wildlife and heritage and former women representative of Isiolo County in the Kenya National Assembly since 23 August 2017. Jaldesa previously served as leader of the opposition for Isiolo county from 2013 to 2017.
