= Maua, Kenya =

Ian Kiriinya Baariu JB

Coordinates: 0°14′N 37°56′E

A view of Maua

Maua is a town in Meru County, Kenya. From 1992 to 2009, it was the capital of the now defunct Meru North District (also known as Nyambene district).

== Overview ==
Maua is located 60 km North of Meru Town on the northwestern slopes of Nyambene Hills and west of Meru National Park. Maua is the headquarters of Igembe South Sub-County and in the former Constitution, dispensation hosted a municipal council'( Under the new Constitution, the country was divided into 47 counties and Maua is but a town. Maua municipality has a population of 50,826, of whom 13,763 are classified as urban.

Maua is one of the economically viable towns in Meru County. Ikweta Country Inn and Conference Centre, Soldat Teachers College and Methodists Nursing School are among the landmarks in Maua.

Maua town is the center of the Khat trade in Kenya, and the world. Income from khat exports to Europe were sharply cut when the UK declared the stimulant a class C drug and banned all imports in June, 2014. Unusual for a town its size Maua has a wide mix of ethnicities, with Ameru, Somali, Kikuyu, Luo among the dominant residents. Places near Maua are Meru, Isiolo and Kathwana
