= Counties of Kenya =

Administrative divisions of Kenya

Counties of Kenya Kaunti za Kenya (Swahili)
- Category: Semi-devolved state
- Location: Republic of Kenya
- Number: 47 counties
- Government: County Government, Government of Kenya
- Subdivisions: Sub-Counties

The counties of Kenya (Swahili: Kaunti za Kenya) are geographical units created by the 2010 Constitution of Kenya as the new units of devolved government. They replaced the previous provincial system. The establishment and executive powers of the counties is provided in Chapter Eleven of the Constitution on devolved government, the Constitution's Fourth Schedule and any other legislation passed by the Senate of Kenya concerning counties. The counties are also single-member constituencies which elect members of the Senate, and special woman members to the National Assembly.

As of 2022, there were 47 counties whose size and boundaries were based on 1992 districts. Following the re-organization of Kenya's national administration, counties were integrated into a new national administration with the national government posting a county commissioner to each county to serve as a collaborative link with national government.

== Establishment ==
County governments were established in all 47 counties after the general elections in March 2013. The counties' names are set out in the First Schedule of the Constitution.

== List of counties ==
Under the new constitution, Kenya is now divided into 47 counties for administrative purposes. They are grouped below according to the former province they were separated from, with their areas and populations as of the 2009 and the 2019 census:

Code	County	Former Province	Area (km^{2})	Population (2009 Census)	Population (2019 Census)	Capital	Registered Voters (2022 Elections)	Postal Abbreviations
001	Mombasa	Coast	212.5	939,370	1,208,333	Mombasa	641,913	MSA
002	Kwale	Coast	8,270.3	649,931	866,820	Kwale	328,253	KWL
003	Kilifi	Coast	12,245.9	1,109,735	1,453,787	Kilifi	588,602	KLF
004	Tana River	Coast	35,375.8	240,075	315,943	Hola	141,096	TRV
005	Lamu	Coast	6,497.7	101,539	143,920	Lamu	81,453	LMU
006	Taita–Taveta	Coast	17,083.9	284,657	340,671	Mwatate	181,827	TVT
007	Garissa	North Eastern	45,720.2	623,060	841,353	Garissa	201,473	GRS
008	Wajir	North Eastern	55,840.6	661,941	781,263	Wajir	207,758	WJR
009	Mandera	North Eastern	25,797.7	1,025,756	867,457	Mandera	217,030	MDR
010	Marsabit	Eastern	66,923.1	291,166	459,785	Marsabit	166,912	MRS
11	Isiolo	Eastern	25,336.1	143,294	268,002	Isiolo	89,504	ISL
12	Meru	Eastern	7,003.1	1,356,301	1,545,714	Meru	772,139	MRU
13	Tharaka-Nithi	Eastern	2,609.5	365,330	393,177	Kathwana	231,932	TNT
14	Embu	Eastern	2,555.9	516,212	608,599	Embu	334,302	EMB
15	Kitui	Eastern	24,385.1	1,012,709	1,136,187	Kitui	532,758	KTU
16	Machakos	Eastern	5,952.9	1,098,584	1,421,932	Machakos	687,565	MCK
17	Makueni	Eastern	8,008.9	884,527	987,653	Wote	479,401	MKN
18	Nyandarua	Central	3,107.7	596,268	638,289	Ol Kalou	361,165	NDR
19	Nyeri	Central	2,361.0	693,558	759,164	Nyeri	481,632	NYR
20	Kirinyaga	Central	1,205.4	528,054	610,411	Kerugoya	376,001	KRG
21	Murang'a	Central	2,325.8	942,581	1,056,640	Murang'a	620,929	MRG
22	Kiambu	Central	2,449.2	1,623,282	2,417,735	Kiambu	1,275,008	KMB
23	Turkana	Rift Valley	98,597.8	1,100,399	1,504,976	Lodwar	238,528	TRK
24	West Pokot	Rift Valley	8,418.2	512,690	621,241	Kapenguria	220,026	WPK
25	Samburu	Rift Valley	20,182.5	223,947	310,327	Maralal	100,014	SBR
26	Trans-Nzoia	Rift Valley	2,469.9	818,757	990,341	Kitale	398,981	TNZ
27	Uasin Gishu	Rift Valley	2,955.3	894,179	1,163,186	Eldoret	506,138	UGS
28	Elgeyo-Marakwet	Rift Valley	3,049.7	369,998	454,480	Iten	213,884	EMK
29	Nandi	Rift Valley	2,884.5	752,965	885,711	Kapsabet	406,288	NDI
30	Baringo	Rift Valley	11,075.3	555,561	666,763	Kabarnet	281,053	BRG
31	Laikipia	Rift Valley	8,696.1	399,227	518,560	Rumuruti	263,012	LKP
32	Nakuru	Rift Valley	7,509.5	1,603,325	2,162,202	Nakuru	1,054,856	NKR
33	Narok	Rift Valley	17,921.2	850,920	1,157,873	Narok	398,784	NRK
34	Kajiado	Rift Valley	21,292.7	687,312	1,117,840	Kajiado	463,273	KJD
35	Kericho	Rift Valley	2,454.5	752,396	901,777	Kericho	428,067	KRC
36	Bomet	Rift Valley	1,997.9	730,129	875,689	Bomet	376,985	BMT
37	Kakamega	Western	3,033.8	1,660,651	1,867,579	Kakamega	844,551	KKG
38	Vihiga	Western	531.3	554,622	590,013	Mbale	310,043	VHG
39	Bungoma	Western	2,206.9	1,375,063	1,670,570	Bungoma	646,598	BGM
40	Busia	Western	1,628.4	743,946	893,681	Busia	416,756	BSA
41	Siaya	Nyanza	2,496.1	842,304	993,183	Siaya	533,595	SYA
42	Kisumu	Nyanza	2,009.5	968,909	1,155,574	Kisumu	606,754	KSM
43	Homa Bay	Nyanza	3,154.7	963,794	1,131,950	Homa Bay	551,071	HBY
44	Migori	Nyanza	2,586.4	917,170	1,116,436	Migori	469,019	MGR
45	Kisii	Nyanza	1,317.9	1,152,282	1,266,860	Kisii	637,010	KSI
46	Nyamira	Nyanza	912.5	598,252	605,576	Nyamira	323,283	NMR
47	Nairobi	Nairobi	694.9	3,138,369	4,397,073	Nairobi	2,415,310	NBI
	TOTAL		581,309.0	38,610,997	47,564,296		22,102,532	

== County governments ==
County governments are responsible for county legislation (outlined in article 185 of the Constitution of Kenya), executive functions (outlined in article 183), functions outlined in the fourth schedule of the constitution of Kenya, functions transferred from the national government through article 187 of the constitution of Kenya, functions agreed upon with other counties under article 189(2) of the constitution of Kenya, and establishment and staffing of a public service (under article 235 of the Constitution of Kenya). The functions of governments assigned to counties by the fourth schedule of the Constitution of Kenya are:

=== Agriculture ===
- Crop and animal husbandry
- Livestock sale yards
- County abattoirs (slaughterhouses)
- Plant and animal disease control
- Fisheries
- Kishada

=== County health services ===
- County health facilities and pharmacies
- Ambulance services
- Promotion of primary health care
- Licensing and control of undertakings that sell food to the public
- Veterinary services (excluding regulation of the profession)
- Cemeteries, funeral parlors and crematoria
- Refuse removal, refuse dumps and solid waste disposal.
- Food distribution and Free services for pregnant mothers

=== Pollution, nuisances and advertising control ===
- Control of air pollution, noise pollution, other public nuisances and outdoor advertising

=== Cultural activities, public entertainment and public amenities ===
- Betting, casinos and other forms of gambling
- Racing
- Liquor licensing
- Cinemas
- Video shows and hiring
- Libraries
- Museums
- Sports and cultural activities and facilities
- County parks, beaches and recreation facilities
- Ice skating
- Sport fishing
- Golf
- Horse racing
- Rugby
- soccer

=== County transport ===
- County roads
- Street lighting
- Traffic and parking
- Public road transport
- Ferries and harbors, excluding the regulation of international and national shipping and matters related thereto
- SGR- Madaraka Express (modern railway experience).

=== Trade development and regulation ===
- Markets
- Trade licenses, excluding regulation of professions
- Fair trading practices
- Local tourism
- Cooperative societies

=== County planning and development ===
- Statistics
- Land surveying, planning and mapping of resources
- Boundaries and fencing
- Housing
- Electricity and gas reticulation and energy regulation

=== Education and childcare ===
- Pre-primary education, village polytechnics, homecraft center's and childcare facilities
- Adult education and national exam registration for the same.

=== Policy implementation ===
- Implementation of specific national government policies on natural resources and environmental conservation
- Soil and water conservation
- Forestry

=== County public works and services ===
- Stormwater management systems in built-up areas
- Water and sanitation services

=== Fire fighting services and disaster management ===
Counties are mandated by the 2010 constitution of Kenya to enact legislation and laws that ensures management and controls of fire fighting.

=== Coordination ===
- Ensuring and coordinating the participation of communities and locations in governance at the local level
- Assisting communities and locations to develop the administrative capacity for the effective exercise of the functions and powers and participation in governance at the local level

== County executive committee ==
The county governor and the deputy county governor are the chief executive and deputy chief executive of the county, respectively. The Independent Electoral and Boundaries Commission shall not conduct a separate election for the deputy governor but shall declare the running mate of the person who is elected county governor to have been elected as the deputy governor. Each county will be run by an executive committee, consisting of:

- A governor, elected directly by the people
- A deputy, elected as running mate of the successful candidate for governorship
- A number of committee members not exceeding a third (or ten where a county assembly has more than 30 members) of the members of the respective county assembly
- A county secretary, nominated by the governor and approved by the county assembly, who will double up as head of the county public service, and secretary to the county executive committee

Uniquely among democracies, Kenyan law requires governors to have a recognised university degree.

== County assemblies ==
The counties each have an assembly whose members are elected from single-member constituencies known as wards. There may also be a number of nominated members as is necessary to ensure that neither male nor female members constitute more than two-thirds of the assembly. There will also be six nominated members to represent marginalised groups (persons with disabilities, and the youth) and a county assembly speaker who will be an ex officio member of the assembly.

== See also ==
- List of counties of Kenya by population
- List of counties of Kenya by poverty rate
- List of counties of Kenya by area
- List of counties of Kenya by fertility rate
- List of counties of Kenya by Gross County Product
- List of counties of Kenya by life expectancy
- ISO 3166-2:KE
