= Tharaka Constituency =

Electoral district of Kenya

Tharaka Constituency is an electoral constituency in Kenya. It is one of three constituencies in Tharaka-Nithi County. The constituency was established prior to the 1988 elections.

== Members of Parliament ==
Elections	MP	Party	Notes
1988	Francis Kagwima	KANU	One-party system.
1992	Francis Kagwima	KANU	
1997	Murango Cicilio Mwenda	DP	
2002	Francis Nyamu Kagwima	FORD–Asili	
2007	Alex Muthengi Mwiru	PNU	
2017	HON. MURUGARA GEORGE GITONGA	TNA	
2022	HON. MURUGARA GEORGE GITONGA	UDA	

== Wards ==
Wards
Ward	Registered Voters
Chiakariga	3,993
Gatue	2,307
Gikingo	4,787
Kamarandi / Kamanyaki	2,608
Kanjoro	3,056
Kathangachini	1,388
Maragwa	2,060
Marimanti	2,686
Nkondi	5,622
Ntugi	2,521
Tunyai	4,682
Turima	4,480
Total	40,190
*September 2005.

== See also ==
- List of constituencies of Kenya
