= Marimanti =

Marimanti Tharaka
- market town
- Location within Kenya
- Coordinates: 00°09′16″S 37°58′34″E
- Country: Kenya
- County: Tharaka Nithi County
- Sub-county: Tharaka South
- Time zone: UTC+3 (EAT)

Marimanti is a small market town in Tharaka South subcounty, of Tharaka-Nithi County, Kenya. The town formerly served as the Headquarters of Tharaka District, which was scrapped after the 2010 Constitution which replaced provincial administrative units with counties. River Kathita flows past the town. Its market is the second largest in the county after that in Chuka.

== History ==
From 1998 to 2009, Marimanti (Tharaka) was the administrative headquarters of Tharaka District.

In 2022, merchants at the Marimanti market organized a tax strike to protest the county government's failure to maintain toilet facilities at the market.

== Facilities ==
There is a magistrate court in Marimanti.

Facilities include Marimanti Hospital with a staff of 160.

== Notable people ==
- Mzalendo Kibunjia, archeologist and administrator.
