= Chuka University =

Public university in Kenya

- Former name: Chuka University College
- Motto: Latin: Sapientia divitia est
- Motto in English: "Knowledge Is Wealth"
- Type: Public
- Established: 2004; 22 years ago
- Chairman: Reuben Indiatsi Nasibi
- Chancellor: Kabiru Kinyanjui
- Vice-Chancellor: Henry Mutembei
- Students: 18,000 (2022)
- Location: Chuka, Tharaka-Nithi County, Kenya; 00°19′10″S 37°39′30″E
- Campus: Rural
- Website: chuka.ac.k results
- Location within Kenya

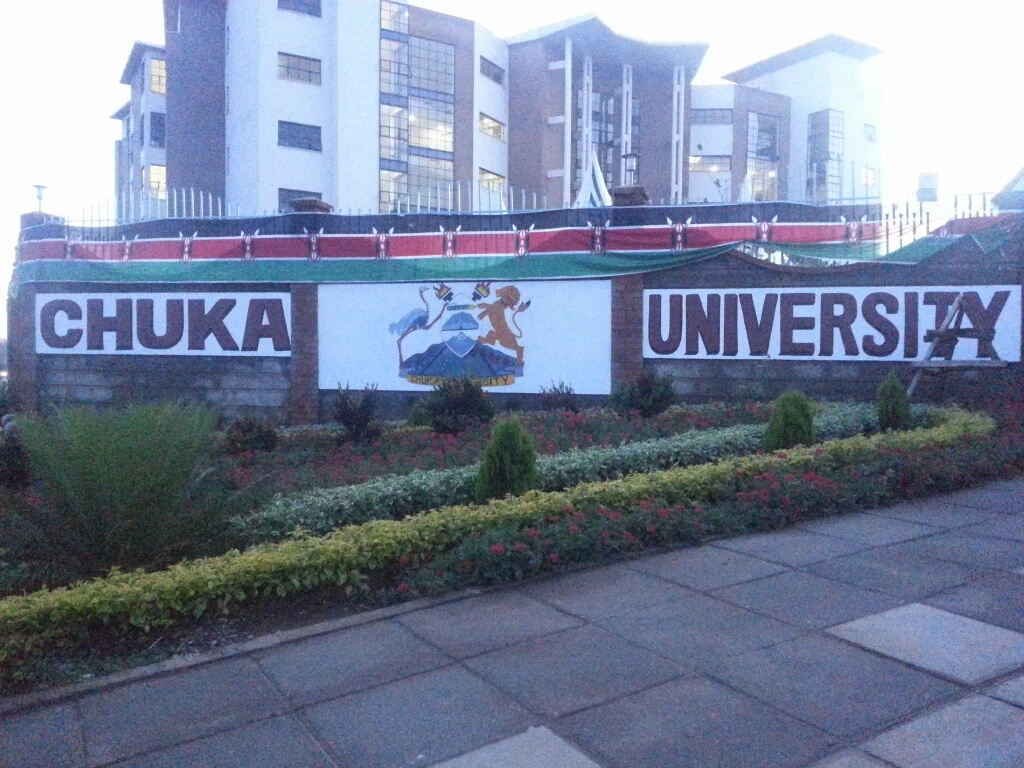
Main Entrance

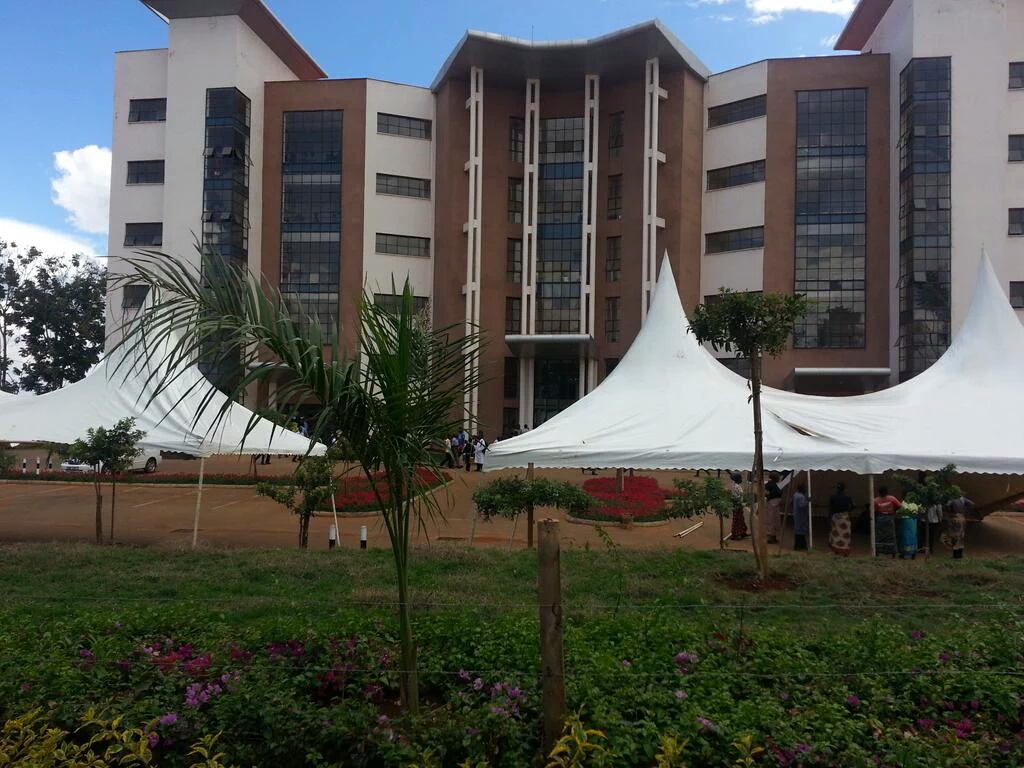
School of Business

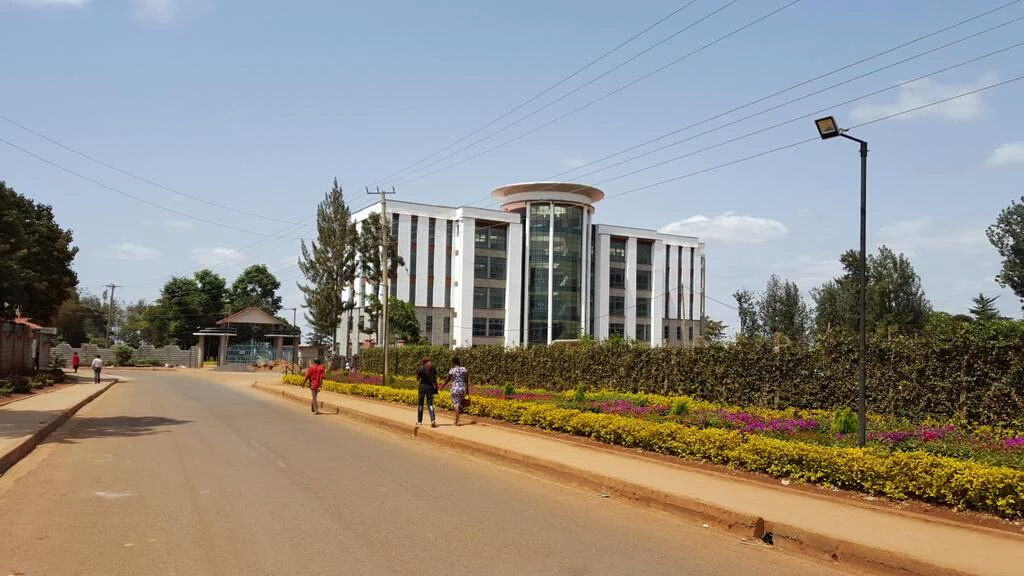
Students Center

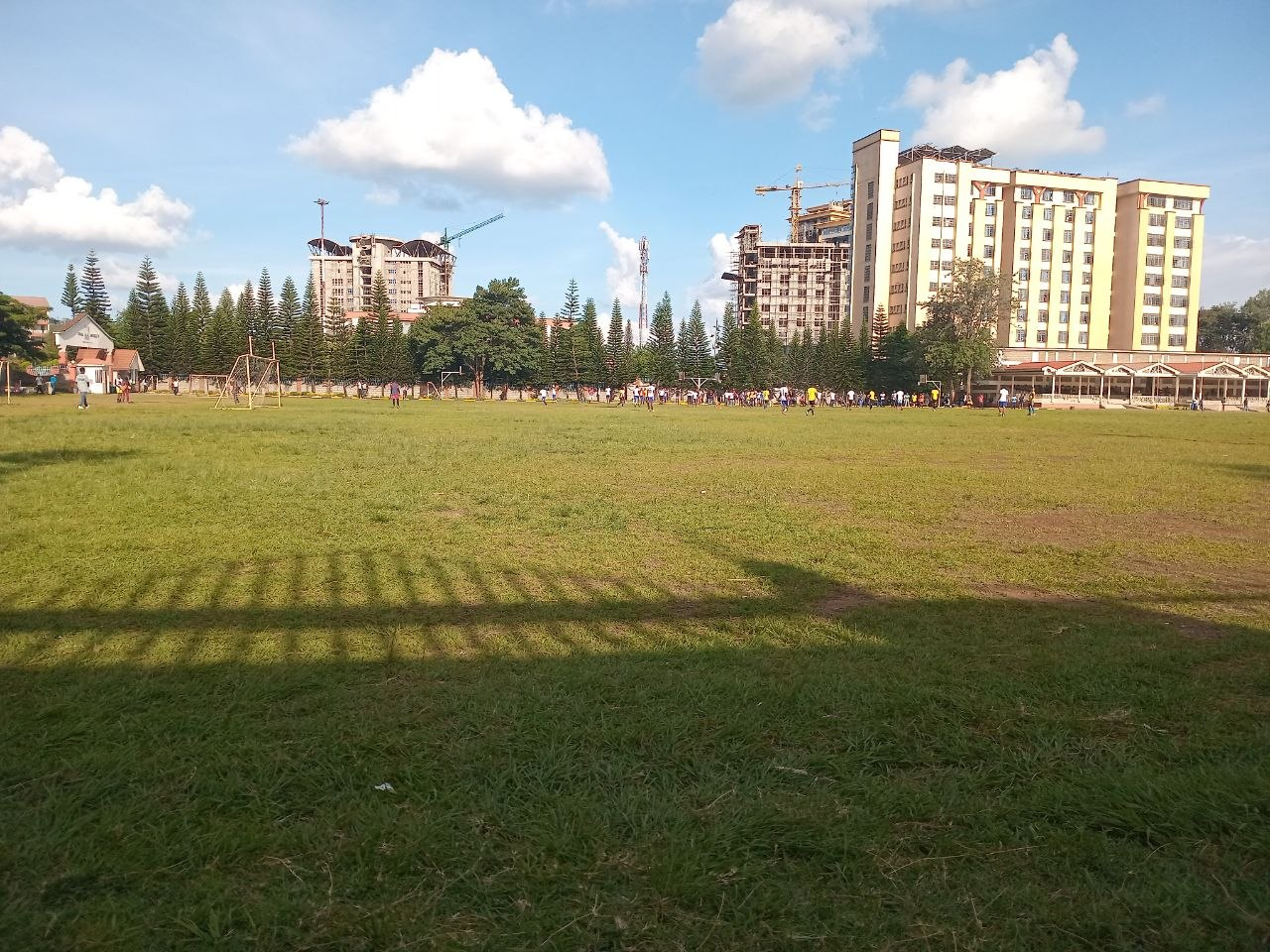
Chuka University as viewed from the pitch-side(pitch A)

Chuka University is a public university in Kenya.

== Location ==
The main university campus is located in the town of Chuka, in Tharaka-Nithi County, along the eastern slopes of Mount Kenya. This location is along the Nairobi-Meru Highway, approximately 172 kilometres (107 mi) northeast of Nairobi, the country's capital city. The elevation of the university campus is approximately 2,000 metres (6,600 ft) above mean sea level.

== History ==
The institution was established on 27 September 2004, by Egerton University Council, as a campus of that university. In 2007, through legal notice No. 161 of 2007 the campus was transformed into "Chuka University College", the successor of the former Egerton University Eastern Campus College, Chuka. President Mwai Kibaki, the country's head of state granted full university charter status to Chuka University on 8 January 2013.

== Campuses ==
- Main Campus
- Igembe Campus
- Embu Campus
- Chogoria Campus
- Town Campus
- Nairobi Campus

== Leadership ==
Professor Erastus Njoka was the university's first vice chancellor, serving in that capacity for the 17 years from 2004 until 2022, when he left to join Kenyan elective politics. He was succeeded in acting capacity by Professor Dorcas Itsusa, who previously served as the deputy vice chancellor for academic affairs, research and student affairs. In June 2023, Professor Henry Mutembei was named as the new substantive vice chancellor, having previously served as deputy vice chancellor for administration, finance, planning and development.

== Academics ==
=== Admissions ===
Self sponsored and government sponsored students are admitted to the university. Most students are admitted to the institution during the September intake. Four thousand admission letters were released by the institution to first year students up for admission in 2024.

=== Teaching and learning ===
The institution offers 2 semesters in each academic year, similar to most public universities in Kenya. First semester commences on September with the second semester commencing in January. Each semester lasts 4 months.

=== Graduation ===
Since its inception as an independent university, Chuka has held 14 graduation ceremonies, which occur towards the end of every year. 3844 students graduated in the 12th graduation ceremony in 2023.

=== Faculties ===
Agriculture and Environmental Studies

- Animal Science
- Plant Science
- Agricultural Economic Agribusiness and Agricultural Education
- Environmental Studies and Resource Development

Education and Resources Development

- Education

Business Studies

- Business Administration
- Management Science

Arts and Humanities

- Social Science
- Humanity

Science and Technology

- Biological Sciences
- Physical Sciences
- Computer Science & ICT

Faculty of Engineering

==== School of Nursing and Public Health ====
Source:

== Student life ==
=== Sports ===
Chuka competes in annual university sports competition which are organized by Kenya University Sports Federation(KUSF) and local tournaments within or outside the institution. Students engage in competitive football, rugby, basketball, hockey. The university dominates ruby and football tournaments in the central region and has taken part in the KUSF tournaments up to the national level.

=== Domitories and student housing ===
Undergraduate students live on campus and off-campus. Chuka has male and female hostels for on-campus students (residents) New hostels are also being built by the institution under funding by the national government. It is optional whether or not a student may wish to be a resident.

== See also ==
- Tharaka University
- University of Embu
