= Mumina Gollo Bonaya =

Kenyan politician

Mumina Bonaya
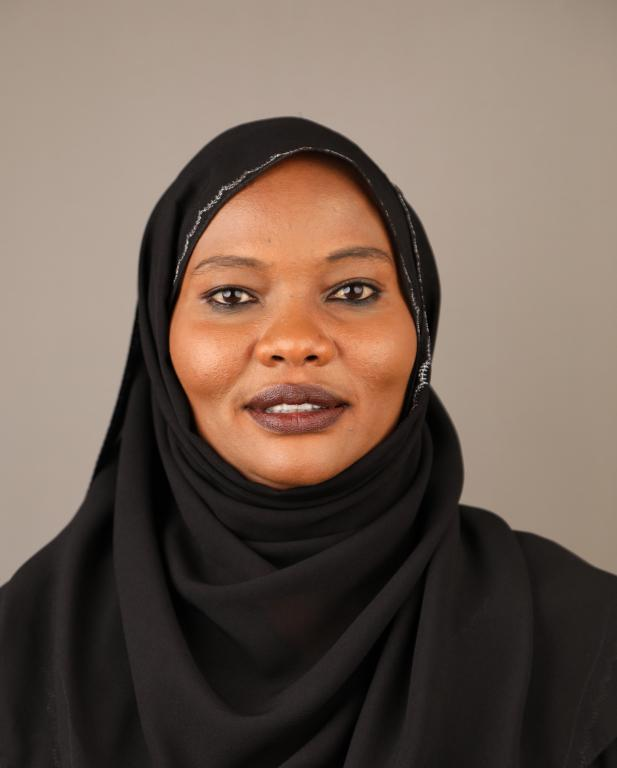

Woman Representative for Isiolo County
- Incumbent
- Assumed office 16 August 2022
- Preceded by: Rehema Dida Jaldesa

Personal details
- Party: Jubilee Party
- Education: Kagumo Teachers College, University of Nairobi

Mumina Gollo Bonaya is a Kenyan politician who is currently a member of the Kenya National Assembly as the woman representative for Isiol. She is a member of the Jubilee Party. She previously worked in education, becoming the chief Administrative Secretary of the Ministry of Education, Science and Technology (Kenya).

== See also ==
- 13th Parliament of Kenya
