= National Accord and Reconciliation Act 2008 =

Kenyan Parliament
- Enacted by: 10th Parliament of Kenya
- Status: Current legislation

The National Accord and Reconciliation Act of 2008 is an act of the National Assembly of Kenya that temporarily re-established the offices of Prime Minister of Kenya, along with the creation of two deputy prime ministers. This act followed the February 28, 2008, power-sharing agreement between current President Mwai Kibaki and opposition leader Raila Odinga, who became the first prime minister of Kenya since 1964, when the constitution of the newly created Republic abolished the office. The agreement was necessitated by the 2007-08 Kenyan crisis.

== Details of the act ==
The Cabinet created by the act consists of the president, vice-president, prime minister, two deputy prime ministers, and 42 other appointed ministers. The Prime Minister, while being appointed by the President without the need for prior consultation, has a distinct portfolio and coordinates the reform agenda and supervise ministries. The PM is also accountable to the President and is immune from civil or criminal prosecution. Like in most other parliamentary democracies, the prime minister's government is dependent upon the party majority or power-sharing coalition majority in parliament. It will fall from power if or when:

- the 10th Kenyan Parliament is dissolved, or
- the coalition members agree in writing, or
- one coalition member withdraws from the coalition by resolution of the member's party's decision-making body
- The Constitution of Kenya, enacted in August 2010 provided for the extension of the power sharing government to the end of its natural term. The Prime Minister can be dismissed from office by majority vote of the Parliament.

In the drafting, the act suggests that the Permanent Secretary in the Prime Minister's office will serve as Secretary to the Cabinet and head of the civil service, which means that this Permanent Secretary will also coordinate the work of other Permanent Secretaries. In the final draft, and consequent bill, the language of the Act did not dictate that the PS in the PM's office would serve as the Secretary to the Cabinet and thus the Head of the Civil Service. The role of the PM and his office as per the Act is to supervise and co-ordinate activities of government. The role of the Head of Civil Service as per the constitution is to implement policy directives given to the office by the Office of the President. The vagueness of these two roles has neither been in addressed in the National Accord Act nor the Constitution of Kenya, thus creating discrepancies that resulted in a brief power struggle between the two partners in the coalition. The National Accord does not state whether the Act itself takes precedence over the Constitution of Kenya or not, thus leading to an impasse in the appointment of the Leader of Government Business that persisted for several months before being resolved. The act also does not spell out the events that would follow if one of the partners from the coalition withdraws.

== History of enactment ==
Two drafts of the reconciliation act were created:

- one by the PNU-led government known as the Establishment of the Prime Minister and Deputy Prime Minister's Act 2008, which would create a non-executive prime minister
- one presented by the ODM-majority assembly, known as the National Accord and Reconciliation Act 2008, which would create a grand executive coalition between the ODM and PNU.

The ODM draft was passed on March 18, 2008, soon after the National Assembly convened on March 6.

== See also ==
- 2007-08 Kenyan crisis
- National Cohesion and Integration Commission
