= Chuka, Kenya =

Town in Tharaka-Nithi County, Kenya

Coordinates: 0°20′S 37°39′E

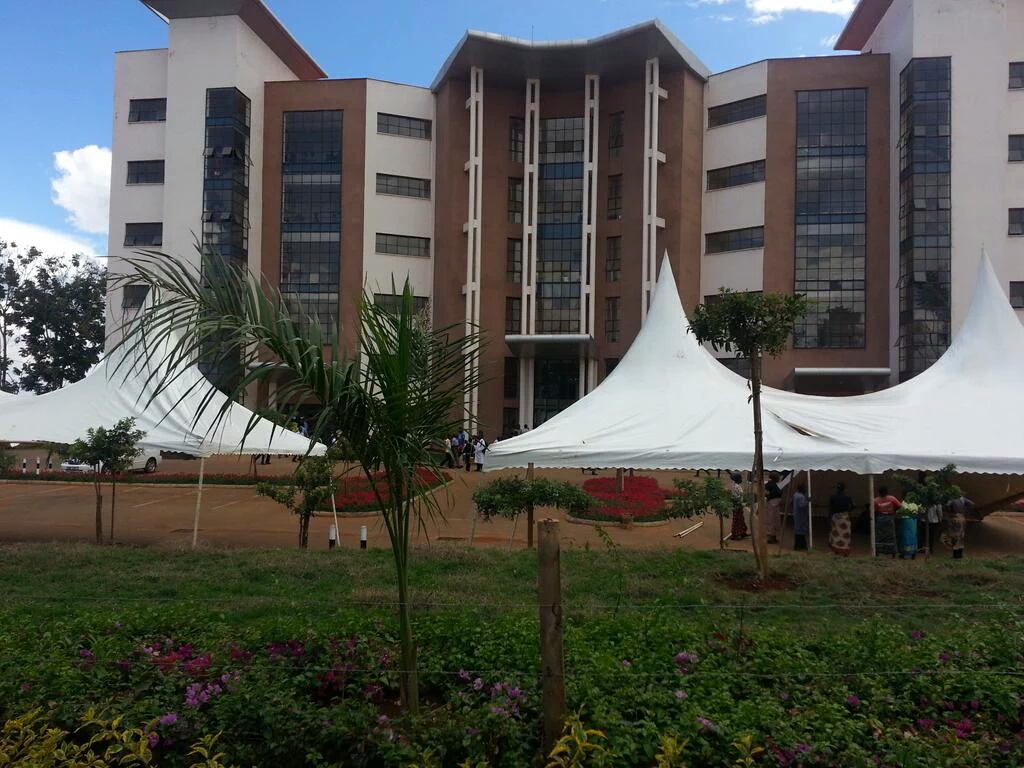
Chuka University

Chuka is a town on the eastern slopes of Mount Kenya, about 65 km south Of Meru Town. It falls within Tharaka-Nithi County and the former Eastern Province. Between 1992 and 2009, Chuka was the capital of Tharaka-Nithi District (split from Meru District). Tharaka Nithi District was further split into Meru South and Tharaka Districts with Chuka remaining the Capital of Meru South. Later, Meru South and Tharaka were amalgamated into Tharaka-Nithi County.

== Chuka people ==
The people of the area are Gichuka speaking, a dialect of the Kimeru language.

Chuka Town is chiefly occupied by the Chuka people, one of the nine Meru dialect Speakers. They dwell on the south-eastern slopes of Mt. Kenya, and cover the area between the Thuci River in the south, and the Nithi River in the north. It is a common tradition with the Chuka that they have always been in the forests of Mt. Kenya hence they moved down to their present abode. Other versions of the Chuka migratory tradition say that they came out from Mbwa with the other Meru.

The Chuka are believed to have sprung from the Tharaka, another Meru subtribe. They also have a form of blood brotherhood with the Igembe and the Tigania of the northern Meru dialects. On the other hand, there are some customs, such as the method of circumcision, by which the Chuka are similar to the Embu. The Chuka are primarily Meru who, having climbed the first slopes of Mt. Kenya, clearing the forest for cultivation (even at present the fields of the Chuka are on the lower section of their country), mixed with the aboriginal inhabitants of the forest and established some kind of contact with the Embu. These aboriginal forest inhabitants seem to have been the Gumba, now only remembered by some traditions and described as very small people. It seems certain that they were a pygmy race.

Some even say that the Chuka may have come from the Coast about AD 1300. Their exodus was provoked by an invasion from Somalia, which drove away the people living around Shungwaya, north of Malindi.

Of the former Meru District, the Chuka were those who suffered most the impact and violence of Mau Mau rebellion. During the Emergency, they were the only Meru to be forcibly settled into villages of the Kikuyu and Embu pattern. Later, they were allowed to return to their fields, as before.

== Population ==
The population of Chuka is 19,347+ according to the GeoNames geographical database.

== Politics ==
Chuka and the surrounding area politics were dominated by the Democratic Party that was led by former Kenya President Mwai Kibaki from 1992 to 2002. When NARC was formed in 2002, the population shifted their allegiance to NARC. It follows then that the local residents shifted to PNU in the contested 2007 elections and overwhelmingly voted for the PNU candidate - Mwai Kibaki. In the four elections that Kibaki contested, the area overwhelmingly supported him.

The Chuka people largely practice Christianity with a small minority of Muslims and traditional religions. According to Zaphania Samuel Mumbere, a scholar and an authority in the Chukan's customs, traditions and ways of life, the Chuka people were a close knit society that kept the spirit of the community alive by oral narrations and practices that were passed down generations. Chuka is part of Chuka Igambang'ombe sub-county. In 2013 the residents shifted to the Jubilee party headed by Kenyatta and Ruto.

== Academics ==
Colleges have recently blossomed in Chuka and its vicinity with Chuka University being the major new development, headed by Prof. Njoka. While holders of PhD degree were few or none 2 decades ago, in the last 10 years Chuka has had a major development in terms of PhD holders with notable figures such as Prof Micheni J. Ntiba. Notably, some are serving as Heads of Government Institutions, VCs, PSs and University Principals among others.
