= National Cohesion and Integration Commission =

Government agency of Kenya

The National Cohesion and Integration Commission (NCIC) is a government agency of Kenya. It is intended to address and reduce inter-ethnic conflicts.

The Commission was created by the National Cohesion and Integration Act following the 2007–2008 post-election crisis.

== Roles ==
The commission's function is primarily prevention of discrimination on the basis of race or ethnicity, advocating for cohesiveness among the diverse groups in the country and enforcing the legal provisions of the National Cohesion and Integration Act 2008.

== Membership ==
The current membership of the Commission is:

- Samuel Kobia – Chairperson
- Wambui Nyutu – Vice Chairperson
- Phillip Okundi
- Abdulaziz Ali Farah
- Danvas Makori
- Sam Kona
- Dorcas L. Kedogo

== Nakuru County Peace Accord ==
Nakuru County was seen as the epicenter of violence in the aftermath of the disputed 2007 presidential elections which left over 1,100 people dead and over 350,000 displaced nationwide.

The Nakuru County Peace Accord (or "Rift Valley Peace Accord") refers to the peace agreement signed on 19 August 2012 between elders of the Agikuyu and Kalenjin communities as well as other ethnic groups of Kenya.

The agreement was signed following a 16-month-long peace process led by the National Cohesion and Integration Commission and the National Steering Committee on Peace Building and Conflict Management, with technical support from the Centre for Humanitarian Dialogue. Alice Wairimu Nderitu, a Commissioner of the National Cohesion and Integration Commission, led the mediation process that led to the peace agreement signed by 10 ethnic communities in Nakuru. For 16 months, she led the crafting the peace process with 100 elders and three mediators. It was designed to address sources of ethnic conflict and a history of violence in the rift valley region of Kenya.

== See also ==
- National Accord and Reconciliation Act 2008
