= Franklin Linturi =

Kenyan politician (born 1969)

Mithika J Linturi

Minister for agriculture

Personal details
- Born: 1969 (age 56–57) Meru, Kenya
- Education: Meru Technical College

Franklin Mithika Linturi is a Kenyan politician who previously served as the Cabinet Secretary for Agriculture from his appointment in 2022 until his dismissal from office by President William Ruto in 2024. He previously served as the senator for Meru County in the Senate of Kenya elected in 2017 Kenyan General election on a Jubilee Party ticket. He previously served as Member of Parliament on a Kenya African National Union ticket elected to represent the Igembe South Constituency in the National Assembly of Kenya since the 2007 Kenyan parliamentary election a position he retained until 2017 when he became a senator. He was married to Marianne J. Kitany but by 2019, they had divorced.
