= Mohammed Kuti =

Former Governor of Isiolo County

Dr. Mohamed Abdi Kuti

Former Governor (Isiolo County)
- In office 23 August 2017 – 8th August 2022
- Preceded by: Godana Doyo
- Succeeded by: Abdi Ibrahim Hassan

Senator (Isiolo County)
- In office 2013–2017
- Succeeded by: Fatuma Adan Dullo

Minister of Livestock Development
- In office 2008–2013

Member of the Kenyan Parliament
- In office 2002–2013
- Preceded by: Charfano Guyo Mokku
- Succeeded by: Joseph Lomwa Samal
- Constituency: Isiolo North

Personal details
- Born: Mohamed Abdi Kuti; 12 March 1964 (age 62)
- Party: Jubilee Party
- Spouse: Wato Kuti
- Education: University of Nairobi
- Occupation: Medical Doctor

Mohamed Abdi Kuti is a Kenyan politician and the former governor of Isiolo County from August 23, 2017. Kuti previously served as the senator for Isiolo county for one term (2013–2017), a post he was elected to as a member of the United Republican Party. He further represented the Isiolo North Constituency in the National Assembly of Kenya for 10 years (2003-2013). He also held the positions of Minister for Youth Affairs in 2005 and Minister for Livestock from 2008 to 2013.
