= Chuka/Igambang'ombe Constituency =

Chuka/Igambang'ombe
- constituency
- Country: Kenya
- County: Tharaka-Nithi County

Chuka/Igambang'ombe is one of three constituencies in Tharaka-Nithi County in Kenya.
