= Kathwana =

- Municipality
- Location within Kenya
- Coordinates: 0°19′S 37°52′E
- Country: Kenya
- County: Tharaka Nithi County
- Time zone: UTC+3 (EAT)

Kathwana is the official headquarters for Tharaka Nithi County.
