= Meru District, Kenya =

Former district of Kenya

Meru District was a district of Kenya, located in the Eastern Province. Hived off from Nyeri District in 1906 by the colonial government, it was part of the Kenia Province of the East Africa Protectorate. It remained as part of Kikuyu Province even after it was renamed from Kenia. In 1933, boundaries alterations saw Kikuyu and part of Ukamba provinces consolidated to form the Central Province.

In 1962, with redrawing of boundaries across the Kenya Colony, Meru District was moved to the newly-created Eastern Region. It was among the forty districts of Kenya and one of the six districts of Eastern Kenya. The district returned one member of Parliament to the Senate of Kenya, until Senate's abolition in 1966, when it became purely administrative.

In 1992, Meru District was split to give an extra district of Tharaka-Nithi District.

Meru District comprises the present-day Meru and Tharaka-Nithi counties.
