= Isiolo County =

Coordinates: 0.883333°N 38.6667°E

- County
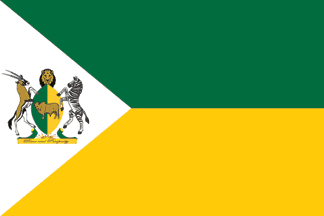
- Flag

- Location in Kenya
- Country: Kenya
- Formed: 4 March 2013
- Capital: Isiolo

Government
  - Governor: Abdi Ibrahim Hassan (Guyo)

Area
  - Total: 25,336.1 km^{2} (9,782.3 sq mi)

Population (2019)
  - Total: 268,002
  - Density: 10.5779/km^{2} (27.3966/sq mi)
- Time zone: UTC+3 (EAT)
- Website: https://isiolo.go.ke/

Isiolo County is a county in the former Eastern Province of Kenya. The population was 268,002 according to the 2019 census. The capital and largest town in the county is Isiolo. Isiolo County is to be the first county to be developed as part of the Kenya Vision 2030 program. Other upcoming urban centres are: Garbatulla, Modogashe, Kinna, Merti and Oldonyiro. The county is home to the Sakuye, Somali and Borana tribes, there are a significant number of people from the Meru, Turkana, Samburu and Gabra communities.

The local topography is arid or semi-arid low plains. The Ewaso Nyiro River flows through the county and partly borders it. It borders Marsabit County to the north, Wajir County to the east, Garissa and Tana River counties to the south east, Meru County to the south, Laikipia County to the south west and Samburu County to the west.

Three different National Game Reserves are located in Isiolo County: Bisanadi National Reserve, Buffalo Springs National Reserve and Shaba National Reserve.

== Demographics ==
Isiolo county has a total population of 268,002 persons at the 2019 census, 139,510 are males; and 128,483 are females; and 9 intersex persons. There is an average of 4.6 persons per household and a population density of 11 persons per square km.

Population by Subcounty
Subcounty	No of Persons
Garbatulla	99,730
Isiolo	121,066
Merti	47,206
TOTAL	268,002

Historical population
Year	Pop.	±%
1979	43,478	—
1989	70,078	+61.2%
1999	100,861	+43.9%
2009	143,294	+42.1%
2019	268,002	+87.0%

== Religion in Isiolo County ==
Religion (2019 Census)	Number	Percentage
Islam	193,775	69.12%
Catholic	32,608	11.63%
Protestant	18,583	6.63%
Evangelical Churches	7,669	2.74%
African instituted Churches	1,709	0.61%
Orthodox	200	0.07%
Other Cristian	3,688	1.32%
Traditionists	8,419	3.00%
Hindu	100	0.04%
Other	932	0.33%
No Religion Atheists	12,551	4.48%
Don't Know	69	0.02%
Not Stated	36	0.01%

== Infrastructure and transport ==
Isiolo covers an area of 1,185.49 square kilometres, with 263.7 kilometres of murram road and 35 kilometres of bitumen in 2014. There are 1,149 installed letter boxes, 851 rented letter boxes and vacant letter boxes.

Isiolo airport is the major airport in the county.

== Administrative and political units ==
As of 2018, the county has two constituencies (Isiolo North Constituency and Isiolo South Constituency), three sub-counties and ten wards.

There are a total of 10 county assembly wards, 71 locations and 144 sub-locations

Constituency	Sub-county	Area (Sq. km)	Ward
Isiolo North	Isiolo	3,269	Wabera
Isiolo North	Isiolo	3,269	Bulla Pesa
Isiolo North	Isiolo	3,269	Burat
Isiolo North	Isiolo	3,269	Ngaremara
Isiolo North	Isiolo	3,269	Oldonyiro
Isiolo North	Merti	12,612	Chari
Isiolo North	Merti	12,612	Cherab
Isiolo South	Garbatulla	9,819	Kinna
Isiolo South	Garbatulla	9,819	Garbatulla
Isiolo South	Garbatulla	9,819	Sericho
Total: 2	3	25,700	10

== Political leadership ==
Abdi Ibrahim Hassan Guyo is the third governor of Isiolo who took office in 2022, he is deputized by Dr. James Lowasa. Fatuma Dullo is the senator and also the first woman to be elected as a senator in Kenya. Mumina Bonaya is the sitting women representative for isiolo and the third to hold the office.

== Education ==
There are 213 ECD centres with enrolment of 5148 pupils, 124 primary schools of which 107 are public and 17 are private schools. 23 secondary schools are spread across the county of which 16 are public and 7 are private schools.

Furthermore, there are two youth polytechnics, three tertiary institutions and two vocational training centres in the county.

== Health ==
There are three hospitals in Isiolo County, two of which are government owned. One hospital is a faith based organisation. There are also five health centres, thirty three dispensaries, and three clinics.

Isiolo county has a total of 214 medical personnel of different specialties ranging from doctors to biochemists.

== Economy ==
The four main crops in Isiolo are maize, beans, sorghum and Mung beans. Livestock is also sold and the four animals kept are cattle (indigenous), cattle (dairy), camels, sheep, and goats.

A total of 178 ponds were in various places in the county in 2014.

== Urbanisation ==
Stats for Isiolo County
County	Stats for the County (Per cent)
Urbanisation	43.5
Literacy	59.8
Attending School (15-18 Yrs)	58.4
Paved Roads	0.2
Good Roads	67.5
Electricity Access	18.5
Poverty Rate	72.6
Stats for the County

Source: USAid Kenya

== Notable people ==
- Hon. Godana Adhi Doyo First governor of Isiolo County 2013-2017
- Hon. Dr Mohammed Abdi Kuti, The longest servicing politician from Isiolo County, served 2 terms as a member of parliament of Isiolo North Constituency, Served as the first Senator of Isiolo County 2013 under the new constitution and later on became the 2nd governor of Isiolo County in 2017-2022.
- Hon. Fatuma Adan Dullo First female senator in 2017 Kenya and current senator of Isiolo County.
- Hon. Rehema Jaldesa Former women representative of Isiolo County 2017-2022.
- Hon. Abdi Ibrahim Hassan Guyo current Governor of Isiolo County.
- Hon. Joseph Lomwa Samal Member of Parliament Isiolo North Constituency 2013-2017 & currently serving again from 2022.
- Hon. Hassan Oda Hulufo former Member of Parliament Isiolo North Constituency 2017-2022.
- Former SSP Mohamed Godana Jarssa & 2007 Isiolo North Aspirant who fell 200 votes short against incumbent Mohamed Abdi Kuti.

== See also ==
- Garissa County
- Isiolo massacre
- Laikipia County
- Maisha Bora
- Marsabit County
- Meru County
- Samburu County
- Tana River County
- Wajir County
