= Tharaka-Nithi County =

County of Kenya

Tharaka Nithi County
- County
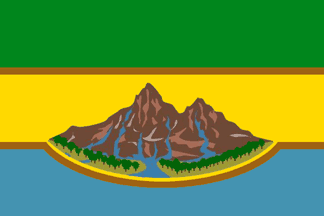
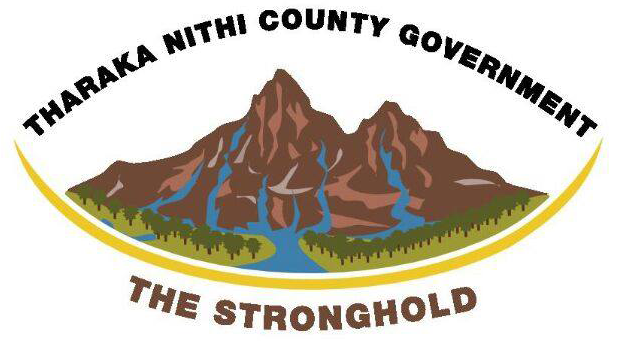
- Flag Coat of arms

- Location of Tharaka-Nithi County in Kenya
- Coordinates: 0°18′S 38°0′E
- Country: Kenya
- Formed: 4 March 2013
- Capital: Kathwana

Government
  - Governor: Muthomi Njuki

Area
  - Total: 2,609 km^{2} (1,007 sq mi)

Population (2019)
  - Total: 393,177
  - Density: 150.7/km^{2} (390.3/sq mi)
- Time zone: UTC+3 (EAT)
- Website: www.tharakanithi.go.ke

Tharaka-Nithi County is one of the 47 counties of Kenya located in Kenya located in the eastern Mount Kenya region. The county has an area of 2609 km^{2} and as of the 2019 census a population of 393,177. It is home to the Meru people.

Tharaka-Nithi County is home to the Chuka, Muthambi, Mwimbi and Tharaka subgroups of the Ameru community. The people of Tharaka-Nithi County are predominantly Christian, with Catholics, Presbyterians, and Methodists being the predominant religious communities.

The county consists of three constituencies: Maara, Chuka and Tharaka.

== History ==
In 1992, Meru District was broken up into four new districts: Meru Central, Meru North, Meru South and Tharaka. Subsequently, Meru South, also known as Nithi, combined with Tharaka into the Tharaka-Nithi District. In 1998, the Tharaka-Nithi District was split into two districts, Nithi and Tharaka, but a 2009 High Court decision declared that split unconstitutional and re-combined the two. Subsequently, under the revised constitution of 2010, Tharaka-Nithi became a county.

== Economy ==
Like other counties surrounding Mount Kenya, the primary economic activity in Tharaka-Nithi County is farming. Crops planted include tea and coffee in the higher areas of the county while sorghum, maize, green grams and millet in the low altitude areas. Dairy farming and fish farming are also practiced in the county.

== Religion ==
Religion in Tharaka-Nithi County

Religion (2019 Census)	Number
Catholicism	108,266
Protestantism	172,266
Evangelical churches	70,043
African-instituted churches	18,749
Orthodoxy	2,656
Other Christian	9.114
Islam	724
Hinduism	9
Traditionism	251
Other	4,082
No religion or atheism	4.461
Don't know	615
Not stated	67

== Prominent personalities ==
- Bernard Mate, politician; member of the Legislative Council and Parliament
- Muthomi Njuki, governor of Tharaka-Nithi County
- Kithure Kindiki, Deputy president, politician; former Senator and former Cabinet Secretary of Interior and Administration
- Mzalendo Kibunjia, archaeologist and museum director
- James Ngugi, entrepreneur and economist
- Erastus Njoka, politician and former and founding vice chancellor of Chuka University.
- Peter K. Muriungi, the first and founding vice chancellor of Tharaka University.

== See also ==
- Isiolo County
- Meru County
- Embu County
- Kitui County
