= Sumer (disambiguation) =

Sumer was the first urban civilization in the historical region of southern Mesopotamia

Sumer may also refer to:

== Places ==
- Sumer, Bhopal, a village in India
- Sumer, Bulgaria, a village in Bulgaria
- Sumer, Sagar, a town in India
- Sumer, Vidisha, a town in India
- Sumer Hill, Texas, an unincorporated community in Henderson County, in the U.S. state of Texas

== People ==
- Sumer Singh of Jodhpur (1898 – 1918), Maharaja of Jodhpur
- Sumer Singh Solanki (born 1972), Indian politician
- Sumer Singh, Sikh historian and writer from India
- Sumer Singh Gardi, 18th-century Maratha guard in India

== See also ==
- Summer (disambiguation)
- Sumer is icumen in, medieval English song
- Sumeria (disambiguation)
- Sumerian (disambiguation)
- Sumerpur (disambiguation)
- Mount Meru (disambiguation) or Sumeru
