= Kolleg St. Ludwig =

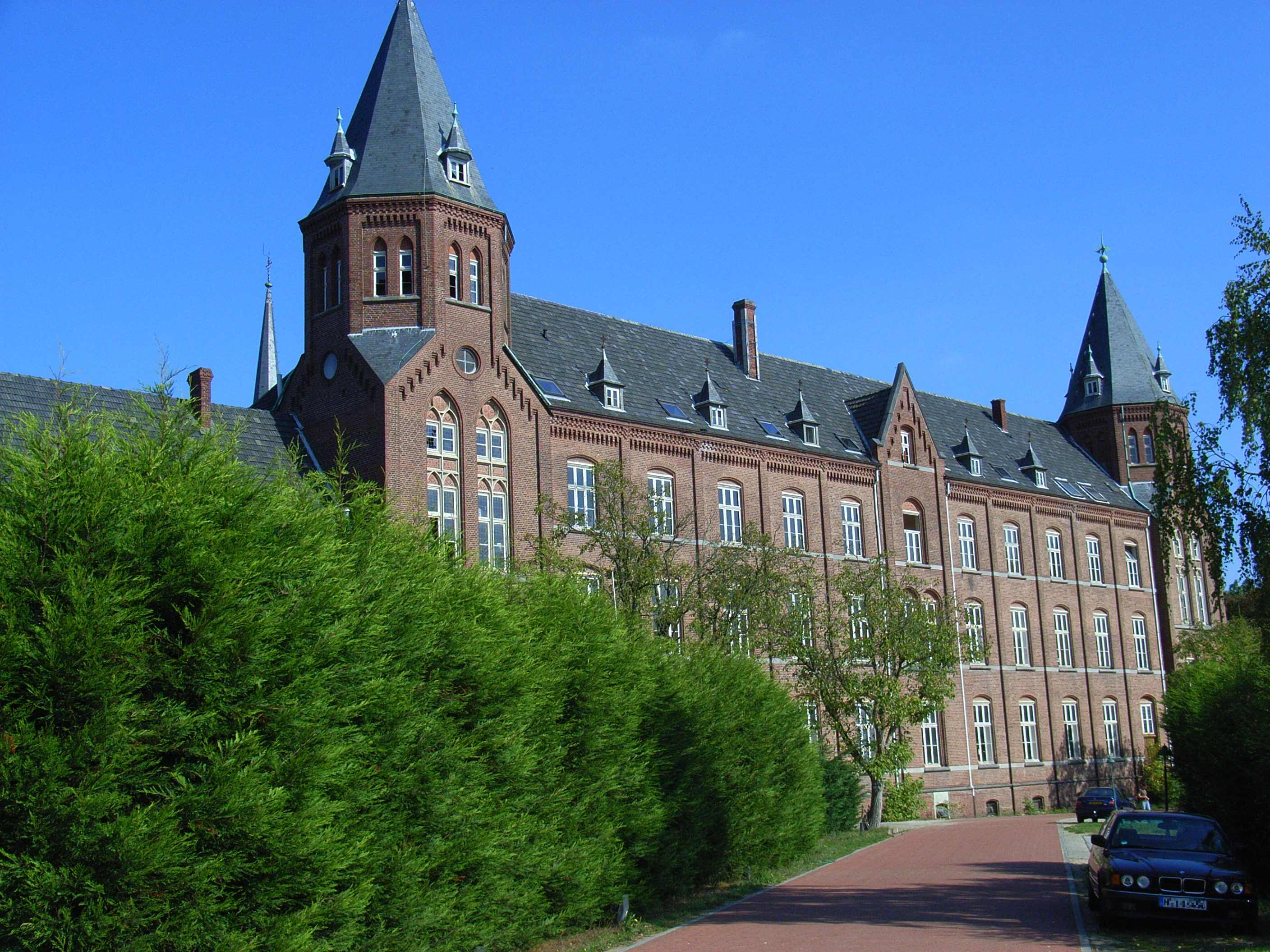
- The main building
- Interactive map of Kolleg St. Ludwig
- 51°9′23″N 6°9′14″E
- Location: Station 24, NP 6063 Vlodrop, The Netherlands

History
- Built: 1909

Site notes
- Area: Limburg
- Governing body: Maharishi European Research University
- Owner: Maharishi Foundation

Kolleg St. Ludwig is a Maharishi European Research University (MERU) campus located in Vlodrop, The Netherlands. It was originally built in 1909, used as a Franciscan friary and boarding school and purchased by the Maharishi Foundation in 1984. The campus is near the villages of Vlodrop-station and Vlodrop in Limburg, the Netherlands, adjacent to the Dutch–German border and the defunct Iron Rhine railroad, and is surrounded by Meinweg National Park.

== History ==
A group of Franciscan brothers from Saxony purchased the land from the owner of a castle in the southern Limburg region of the Netherlands.

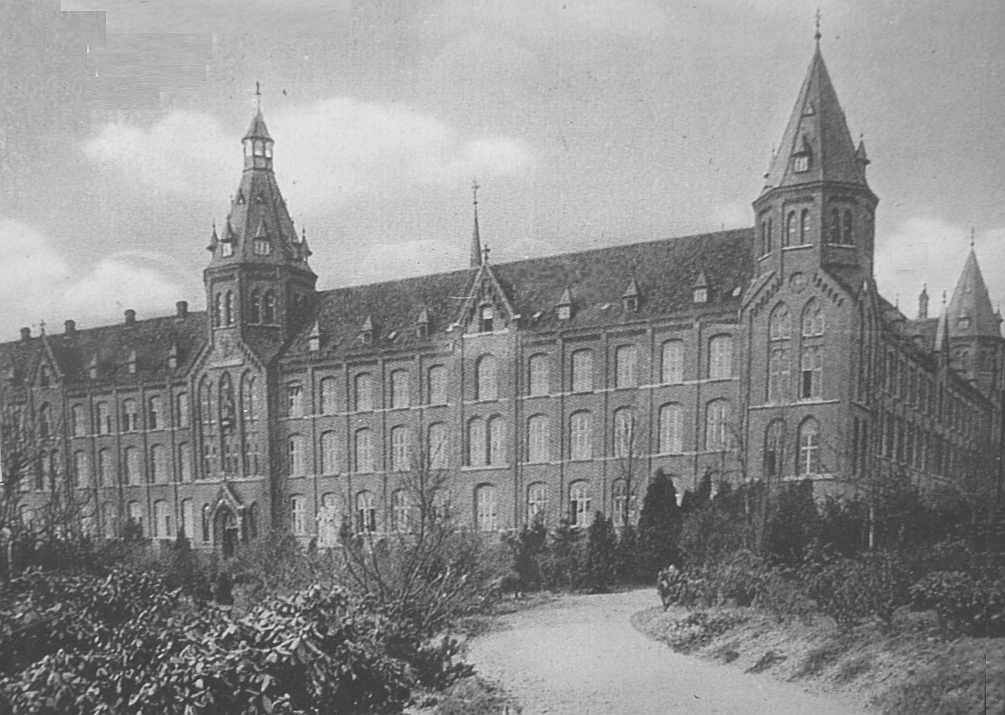
Kolleg St. Ludwig

The college was named after Saint Louis of Toulouse, a saint who was an heir to the throne of Napoli, but who renounced the throne and gave it to his younger brother, and himself became a Franciscan friar, took all the Franciscan vows and served the poor, the sick and the hungry. The seminary building was designed by a monk and featured 600 doors and 1,200 windows, all covered by 17,000 square metres (4.2 acres) of roof. Started in 1904 and completed in 1909, it was completely self-sufficient, with its own generators, workshops, wells, fields and orchards. A small-gauge railroad was built first to transport building materials and then to carry the 300 tons of coke used annually for heating. It was evacuated during World War II and reopened as a school in 1951. It closed in 1978. It was attended by over 3,000 male students.

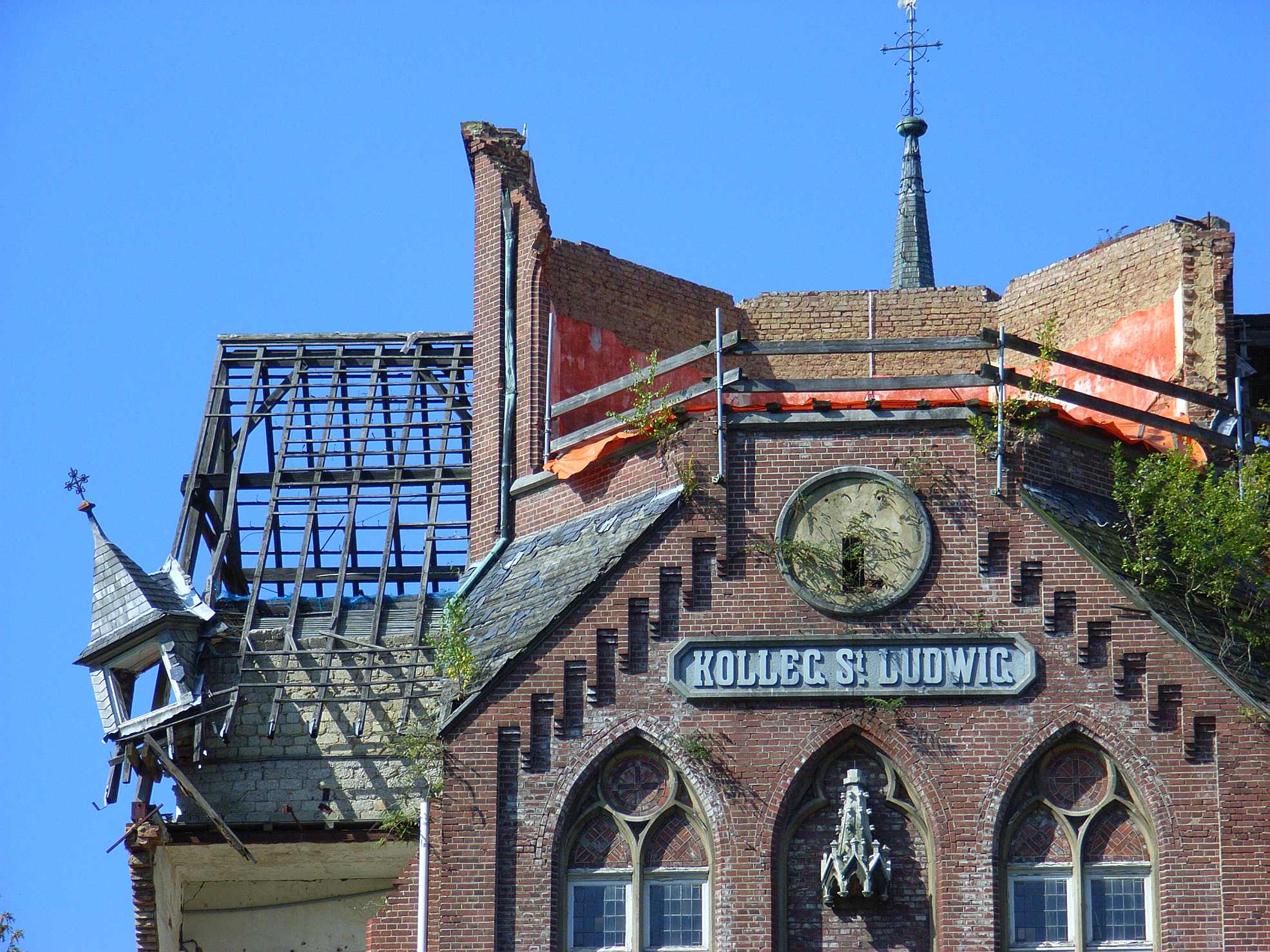
Partial demolition

The Franciscans sold the property to the Dutch government for use as a police training facility but it was never put to use. The Maharishi Foundation purchased the property in 1984 for US$900,000 and it later became the Maharishi European Research University (MERU) campus as well as Maharishi Mahesh Yogi's movement headquarters and residence. The buildings were old, inefficient, in disrepair and did not meet the Maharishi's design standards so his organization entered a two-year "courtroom battle" with preservationists who tried to block the demolition of the Kollege St. Ludwig building which "was abandoned in 1978". A three-story, nearly life-sized canvas illustration of the intended replacement building was put up on the front side of the partially demolished building. The local government later ordered its removal. According to a 2008 report, the MERU Foundation indicated it would consider leaving the site if permission to demolish the old building was not granted.
