= Sumur =

Sumur may refer to:

- Sumur (Levant), a Bronze Age archaeological site and Phoenician city
- Sumur, Ladakh, a village in Nubra, India
- Sumur Batu, Kemayoran, a sub-village of Bekasi, a suburb of Jakarta, Indonesia
- Sumur Gumuling, a subterranean mosque in Yogyakarta, Indonesia

== See also ==
- Sumer (disambiguation)
- Sumuru (disambiguation)
