= Luxembourg question =

Former political issue

The civil flag of the Grand Duchy of Luxembourg and the provincial flag of the Belgian province of Luxembourg became a national symbol of the Luxembourg nation in the course of the First World War.

The Luxembourg question was the political tension surrounding the (Grand) Duchy of Luxembourg, particularly in the 19th century, but also earlier in the late Middle Ages and the early modern period, when the present-day territory of the Grand Duchy of Luxembourg was ruled by different dynasties. The issue at stake in the Luxembourg question was the territorial affiliation and independence of Luxembourg, which was located between the Netherlands, France, Belgium and Germany.

Overall, the years 1815, 1830/1839, 1867, 1870/71 and the years between 1912 and 1919 were the high points of the Luxembourg question. However, the Duchy of Luxembourg, which was independent until the late Middle Ages, was under the rule of the Luxembourg dynasty until it died out and a phase of constant changes of rule began, so that the Luxembourg question had a certain prehistory.

== Late Middle Ages to the early modern period ==
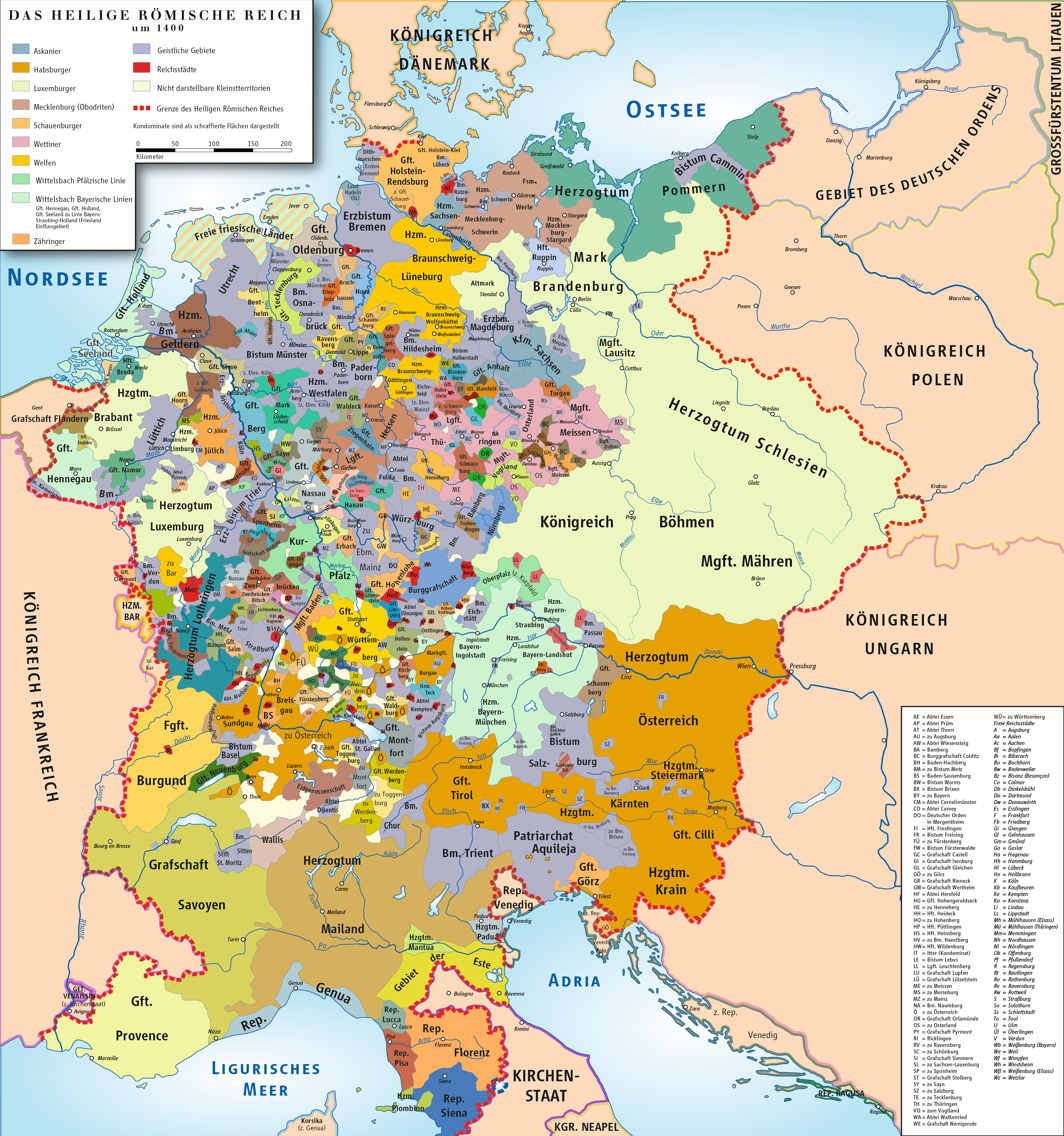
The Holy Roman Empire around 1400, with the Duchy of Luxembourg on the left

Until its annexation by Napoleonic France, Luxembourg was a duchy within the Holy Roman Empire and was ruled by the House of Luxembourg itself until the 1440s. The House of Luxembourg provided a number of Roman-German Emperors, some of whom also became emperors. The last male head of the family was Emperor Sigismund, King of Hungary and Bohemia. With his death, the House of Luxembourg died out in the male line. Elisabeth of Görlitz, the last member of the German line of the House of Luxembourg, sold the Duchy of Luxembourg to the House of Burgundy in 1443. This ended the rule of the Luxembourgers over the Luxembourg region and the first French period began. This was followed by several changes of rulers, but the Burgundians (1443–1482) and Habsburgs (1482-1700 and 1714–1795) were the most important dynasties on the Luxembourg throne. However, a distinction must again be made between the Spanish (1556-1684 and 1697–1700) and the Austrian Habsburgs (1714–1795) for the period after the abdication of Charles V. Between 1684 and 1697, the territory of the Duchy of Luxembourg was under French rule for a second time. In the meantime, the Wittelsbachs, Wettins and the House of Bourbon ruled over Luxembourg. The history of the duchy came to an end in 1795 when France annexed the territory and integrated it into the French state.

The United Kingdom of the Netherlands. In the lower right area is the Grand Duchy of Luxembourg, which was in personal union with the Dutch state, but was not part of it.

== Congress of Vienna 1815 ==
After the French Empire lost the last coalition war, Luxembourg was restored and elevated to a Grand duchy. In addition, the Grand Duchy was awarded to the Dutch king, who also received what is now Belgium (minus Eupen-Malmedy, which was gained in 1919). From then on, the Grand Duchy was part of the United Kingdom of the Netherlands in personal union with the Dutch king. This was for reasons of power politics, as the aim was to create a new balance of power in Europe after the defeat of France. In the territory of the Low Countries, the new Kingdom of the Netherlands (the official name of the above-mentioned state) was ultimately to have supremacy, while the Kingdom of Prussia was to exist in the east and France in the south. However, Luxembourg was not part of the Dutch state, but merely ruled by the same monarch, who reigned as King and Grand Duke of Luxembourg.

In addition, the Dutch king thus became a German federal prince. After the dissolution of the Holy Roman Empire in 1806 and the Confederation of the Rhine in 1815, contrary to the German nationalists, the German Confederation was founded at the Congress of Vienna instead of a unified German state. Luxembourg remained a member of the German Confederation until its dissolution in 1866. Luxembourg itself was also home to one of the most important federal fortresses, which had to be dismantled as a result of the Luxembourg crisis in 1867. Between 1839 and 1866, Luxembourg was also linked via the Dutch king to the Duchy of Limburg, which had also been a federal state in the German Confederation and which was created in the course of the Belgian Revolution of 1839. Together with both duchies, the Dutch king had a vote in the Federal Convention of the German Confederation.

== Belgian Revolution 1830/1839 ==
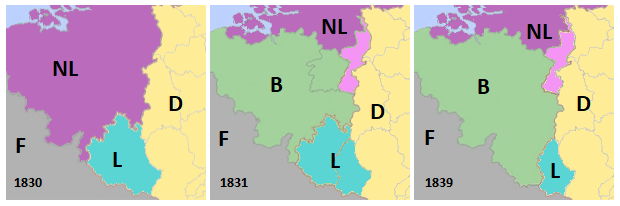
The area around Belgium between 1830 and 1839

In 1830, there was a revolution in the southern Netherlands, whose population was predominantly Roman Catholic, against the predominantly reformed northern part of the Netherlands. As a result of the revolution, the new Kingdom of Belgium left the Dutch state and received a large part of the Grand Duchy of Luxembourg, which is now part of the Kingdom of Belgium as the Province of Luxembourg. There were isolated riots in Luxembourg itself, as the population there was dissatisfied with the Dutch administration. The Dutch form of administration were not suitable for the sparsely populated and poor Luxembourg, so the Luxembourg population used the revolution to demand changes. As early as 1830, negotiations were held in which Luxembourg was to be partially transferred to Belgium. Initial resolutions were generally rejected by Belgium, so that the Great Powers had to renegotiate. The status of Limburg and Luxembourg was subsequently kept open until 1839. In 1831, the existence of the Belgian state was recognized, but the borders were not yet fully settled. In 1839, at the conclusion of the London Conference, the Kingdom of Belgium was recognized, Luxembourg was confirmed as a sovereign Grand Duchy in personal union with the Dutch King and also declared neutral. As a result, the Duchy of Limburg was created, whose historical territory was also divided as a result of the revolution. Luxembourg lost more than half of its previous territory to the new Kingdom of Belgium. In the final treaty, Luxembourg and Limburg were finally divided, with Luxembourg losing significantly more territory. The part ceded to Belgium also left the German Confederation. Subsequently, there were further attempts to unite the rest of Luxembourg with Belgium. In order to prevent economic ties with Belgium, Luxembourg's accession to the German Customs Union in 1842 was successfully negotiated in 1841. Until the 1860s, more or less active attempts were made to bind Luxembourg to Belgium. After that, further attempts were only made during the First World War.

== Luxembourg crisis (1867) ==
In 1867, there was renewed political uncertainty regarding Luxembourg's status in Europe. Between Prussia and France in particular, the uncertainty resulted nearly in a war, which was, however, averted. Due to the fact that Luxembourg was a private property of the Dutch king, he could theoretically have sold the Grand Duchy. In 1867, the French Emperor Napoleon III offered to buy Luxembourg from the Dutch King William III. William was in financial difficulties at the time. After Otto von Bismarck hinted that this would be a casus belli, the major European powers agreed to neutralize Luxembourg and have this guaranteed by the signatory states. Luxembourg should therefore play no role in future conflicts. In addition, Luxembourg should be demilitarized as far as possible. This meant the dismantling of the former federal fortress and the withdrawal of Prussian soldiers from Luxembourg.

== Franco-Prussian War (1870-1871) ==
Luxembourg's neutrality was maintained in 1870/71.

After the North German Confederation under Prussian leadership, together with the remaining southern German states, had won the Franco-Prussian War against France, the cession of some territories was also discussed in addition to reparations payments. Instead of the French, but ore-rich Lorraine, the German-speaking, also ore-rich Luxembourg could join the newly founded German Empire. In the end however, Luxembourg stayed independent. Prussia was able to increase its economic and political influence in Luxembourg enormously. Luxembourg's state railroad came under Prussian and then German administration for 40 years.

== Time around the First World War 1912-1919 ==
Luxembourg in Europe, 1914

Luxembourg became the target of annexation plans during the First World War, despite the neutrality that had been granted and guaranteed. In the run-up to this, the political right in France was already considering the preventive annexation of Luxembourg. An action plan was approved by the War Council in 1912. In Germany, the modified Schlieffen Plan envisaged invading the two neutral states of Luxembourg and Belgium. Germany subsequently occupied Luxembourg. As part of the so-called September Program, Luxembourg became one of Germany's war aims from September onwards and was to remain so until the end of the war. Luxembourg was to join the German Reich as a federal state and regain the territories lost to Belgium. Belgium itself was to remain a vassal state outside the Empire. During the course of the war, France first designated Belgium and Luxembourg, then only Luxembourg and from 1917 neither of the two states as war targets. Luxembourg was renounced in favor of Belgian aspirations, while the Allied states Great Britain and the United States were also against the incorporation of Luxembourg into France. However, Grand Duchess Marie-Adelheid was unpopular with the people and the Entente, as she took a pro-German stance. She described herself as the daughter of a German princely family and the dynasty itself as German. In a referendum in September 1919, the future of the form of government and the economic ties to the two neighboring countries France and Belgium were put to the vote. Ultimately, the people opted for the continued reign of Grand Duchess Charlotte (Marie-Adelheid had abdicated in January 1919) and for economic union with France. However, the latter did not materialize. Luxembourg remained independent after the war, but largely ceded economic sovereignty to Belgium with the Belgium–Luxembourg Economic Union of 1921.

== Second World War and after ==
Luxembourg was a neutral state at the beginning of the Second World War. In May 1940, however, it was occupied by Nazi Germany and the Luxembourg monarchy had to go into exile. Luxembourg remained under German military occupation until August 1942, when Nazi Germany formally annexed it as part of the Gau Moselland into the Greater Germanic Reich. Most of the Jewish population in Luxembourg was subsequently murdered in the Holocaust in Luxembourg. There was resistance to German occupation however, and forced draft of the local population into the German army starting in 1942 resulted in the outbreak of numerous strikes. A general strike led to violent Nazi repression. U.S. forces liberated most of the country in September 1944. Allied forces finally expelled the Germans in January 1945 following a German counter offensive. The independence of Luxembourg was restored. After the war, Luxembourg became part of NATO and the European Coal and Steel Community. With European integration, the Luxembourg question was solved, with independent Luxembourg having its own identity in a United Europe.

== See also ==
- Mir wëlle bleiwe wat mir sinn
- Partitions of Luxembourg
- History of Luxembourg
