= Meru =

Meru may refer to:

== Geography ==
=== Kenya ===
- Meru, Kenya, town in Meru County in the republic of Kenya
- Meru County, one of Kenya's 47 counties that was created by the 2009 merger of 3 districts:
  - Meru Central District
  - Meru North District
  - Meru South District
- Meru National Park, a Kenyan wildlife park
- Meru District, a former district of Kenya

=== Tanzania ===
- Meru District, a district in Arusha Region, Tanzania
- Meru, Tanzania, a village in northern Tanzania (Meru District)
- Mount Meru (Tanzania), a volcano near Arusha in northern Tanzania

=== Other places ===
- Mary, Turkmenistan, a city in the Karakum Desert, formerly named Meru
- Meru, Hazaribagh, a small town in Jharkhand, India
- Meru, Malaysia, a town in Klang, located in Selangor
- Meru, Western Australia, a locality near Geraldton
- Méru, a commune of the Oise département in France
- Meru Peak, a mountain in the Indian Himalayas, not to be confused with Mount Meru (see the section Other uses below)

== Entertainment ==
- Meru (film), a 2015 documentary about climbing Meru Peak
- Prince Meru (Sgt. Frog), main character from the anime movie Keroro Gunso the Super Movie 2: The Deep Sea Princess
- Meru (Legend of Dragoon), a playable character from the video games The Legend of Dragoon

== People ==
=== Ethnic groups ===
- Meru people, also known as Amîîrú, are a people of Kenya
- Meru, another name for the Aboriginal Australian Erawirung people of South Australia
- Wameru, Bantu for the Meru people of northern Tanzania

=== Individuals ===
- Meru (overseer of sealers), an Ancient Egyptian official under king Mentuhotep II in the Eleventh Dynasty
- Vatsu Meru, politician from Nagaland, India

== Organizations ==
- Meru Networks, a supplier of wireless local area networks that was acquired by and integrated into Fortinet in 2015
- Meru Cabs, a taxi aggregator company based in Mumbai, India.
- Maharishi European Research University (MERU), a school that researches transcendental meditation
  - MERU, Holland, the current location in Vlodrop, Netherlands

== Other uses ==
- Meru (beetle), a family of aquatic beetles
- Meru language, the language spoken by the Meru people (Ameru)
- Milli Earth Rate Unit, an angular velocity equal to 1/1000 of Earth's rotation rate; see inertial navigation system
- Maha Meru, a 3-dimensional Sri Chakra Yantra
- Mount Meru, a mountain in Hindu, Jain and Buddhist mythology
- Pelinggih meru, the multiple tiered roofs similar to pagoda in Balinese temple
- An alternate (erroneous) name for Mount Kailash

== See also ==
- Mount Meru (disambiguation)
- Mahameru (disambiguation)
- Mweru (disambiguation)
- Meroo National Park, a national park in on South Coast of New South Wales, Australia
