= Military occupations of Luxembourg =

There have been several military occupations of Luxembourg through the ages. Amongst them have been:

- The French occupation of Luxembourg during the Franco-Spanish War. This led to the first Partition of Luxembourg, with the loss of Thionville, under the Treaty of the Pyrenees.
- The Prussian occupation of Luxembourg from 1815 until 1867. Under the 1815 Treaty of Paris, which ended the Napoleonic Wars, the fortress of Luxembourg City came under the control of the German Confederation. Thus, Luxembourg was occupied by Prussian soldiers until the 1867 Treaty of London ordered an end to the occupation and the demolition of the fortifications.
- The German occupation of Luxembourg in World War I (1914–1918).
- The German occupation of Luxembourg in World War II (1940–1944).
