= Louis of Toulouse =

French Catholic bishop and saint (1274–1297)

Saint Louis of Toulouse
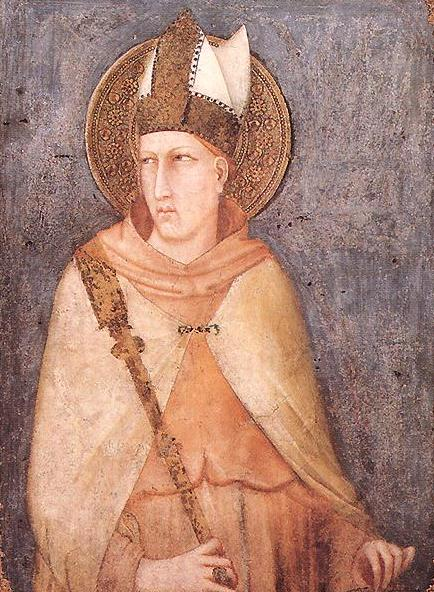
- Fresco by Simone Martini
- Born: 9 February 1274; Brignoles, France
- Died: 19 August 1297 (aged 23); Brignoles, France
- Venerated in: Catholic Church
- Canonized: 7 April 1317 by John XXII
- Major shrine: Valencia, Spain
- Feast: 19 August
- Attributes: boy bishop, often with a discarded crown by his feet; represented vested in pontifical garments and holding a book and a crosier
- Patronage: Valencia (Spain); Málaga; Mission San Luis Obispo de Tolosa; Limosano (Italy); Baler (Philippines); Lucban (Philippines)

Saint Louis of Toulouse (9 February 1274 – 19 August 1297), also known as Louis of Anjou, was a Neapolitan prince of the Capetian House of Anjou and a Catholic bishop.

== Life ==
Louis was born in Brignoles, Provence (or in Italy, at Nocera, where he spent a part of his early life), the second son of King Charles II of Naples and Mary of Hungary. His father, Charles, became king of Naples in 1285 and was taken prisoner in Italy, during the war with King Peter III of Aragon that followed the Sicilian Vespers. Charles obtained his own freedom by giving over his three sons as hostages. Louis and his brothers were taken to Catalonia, where they were placed under the care of Franciscan friars for their education and held for seven years. Impressed by one of the friars in particular, Arnauld de Villeneuve, Louis took up the study of philosophy and theology. Though still held in captivity, Louis was made archbishop of Lyon as soon as he reached his majority. When his older brother died of plague in 1295, Louis also became heir apparent to his father's kingdom; however, when he was freed that same year, Louis went to Rome and gave up all claims to the Angevin inheritance in favor of his brother Robert and announced that instead he would take the Franciscan vows of poverty, chastity, and obedience.

On 5 February 1297, Louis was consecrated Bishop of Toulouse by Boniface VIII, where his granduncle Alphonse had until recently been count, but had died in 1271 leaving no heir. Here Louis stood in an ambivalent dynastic and ecclesiastical position, in a territory between Provence and Aquitaine that was essential to Angevin interests. Despite the princely standing that had won him this important appointment at the age of about 22, Louis rapidly gained a reputation for serving the poor, feeding the hungry, and ignoring his own needs. After just six months, however, apparently exhausted by his labors, he abandoned the position of bishop. Shortly thereafter he died at Brignoles of a fever, possibly typhoid, at age 23.

Two music theory treatises, De musicae commendacione and Sentencia in musica sonora subiecti, are sometimes attributed to him, but are now thought to be the work of Lodewijk Heyligen (1304–1361).

== Veneration ==
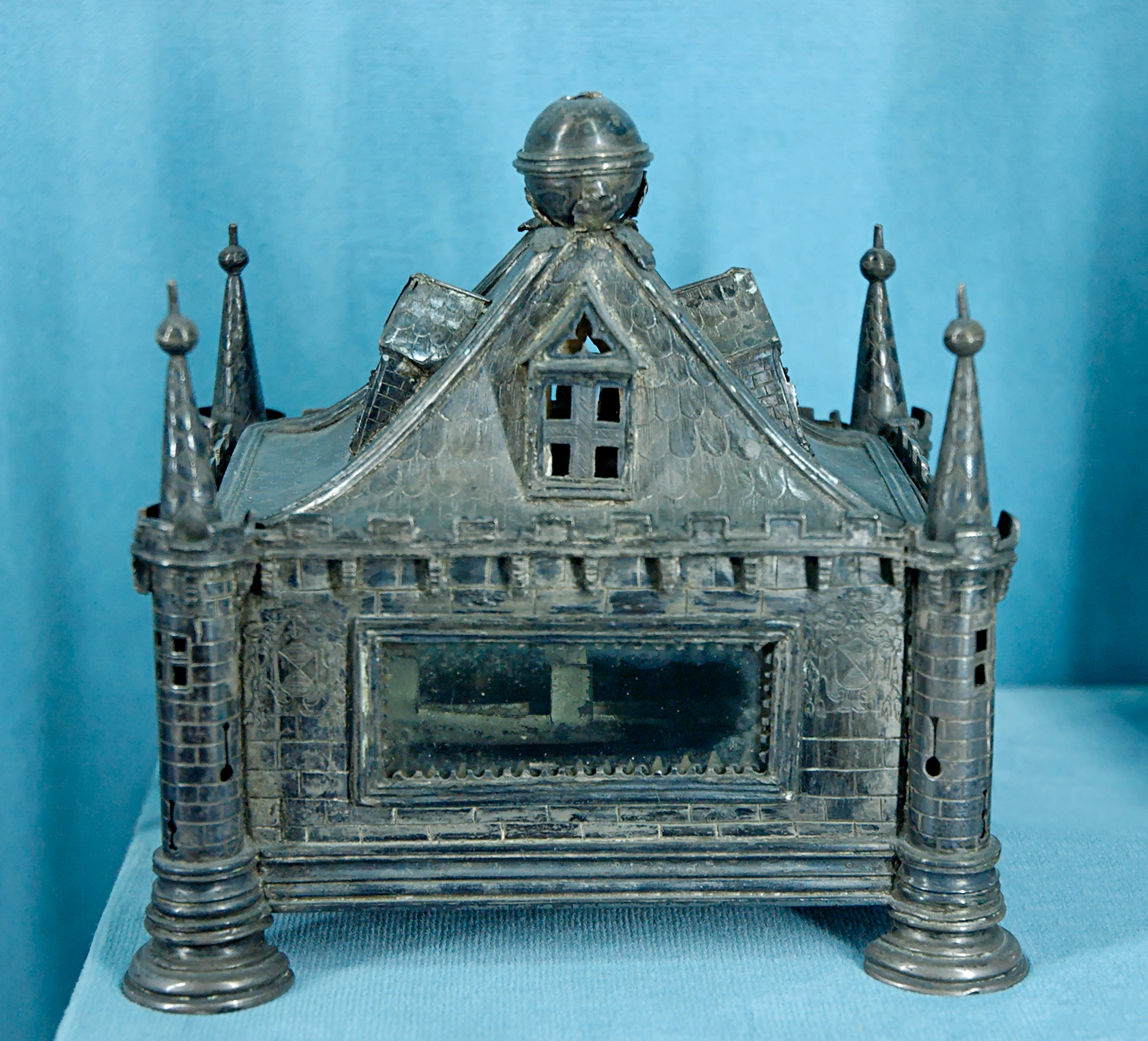
Silver reliquary of Saint Louis of Toulouse (Musée de Cluny)

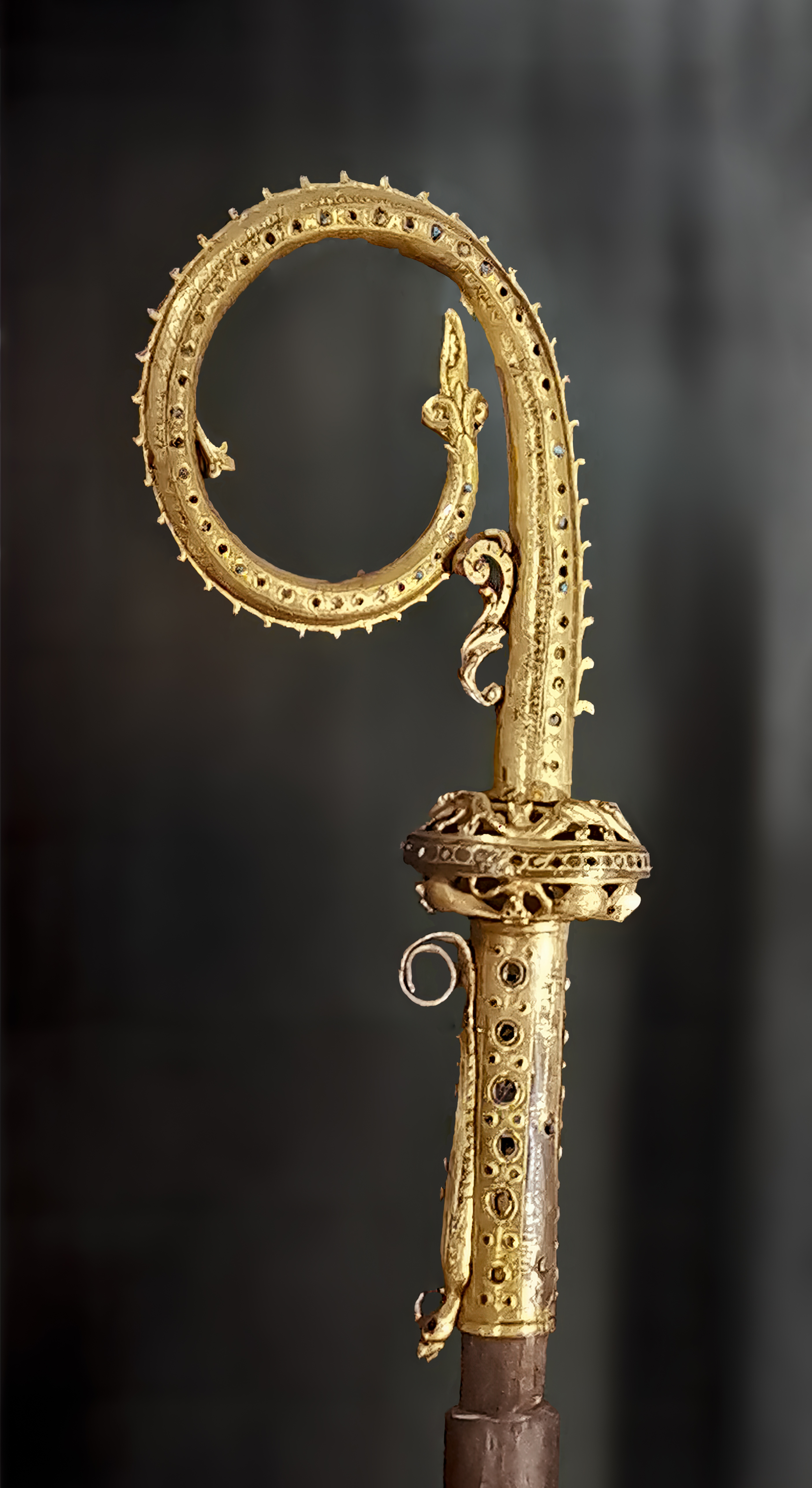
Basilique Saint-Sernin de Toulouse - Crosier of Louis of Toulouse

Procedures for the canonization of Louis were quickly urged. His case was promoted by Pope Clement V in 1307, and he was canonized by John XXII on 7 April 1317 with the bull Sol oriens. His brother Robert at Naples who owed his crown to Louis commissioned a great altarpiece from Simone Martini, depicting Louis being crowned by angels as he simultaneously crowned Robert.

The cult of Saint Louis of Toulouse took hold in Hungary. His nephew Charles I of Hungary (1307–1342) exalted his image and veneration, consecrating churches and a monastery in the settlement of Lippa in his honor, and giving the name of the saint to his eldest son, Louis I of Hungary (1342–1382). Louis of Toulouse was not otherwise widely venerated in the rest of Europe, but the Franciscans embraced him, keeping his day in their calendar. In 1423, Alfonso V of Aragon sacked Marseille and placed Louis' relics in Valencia, where he was made its patron saint.

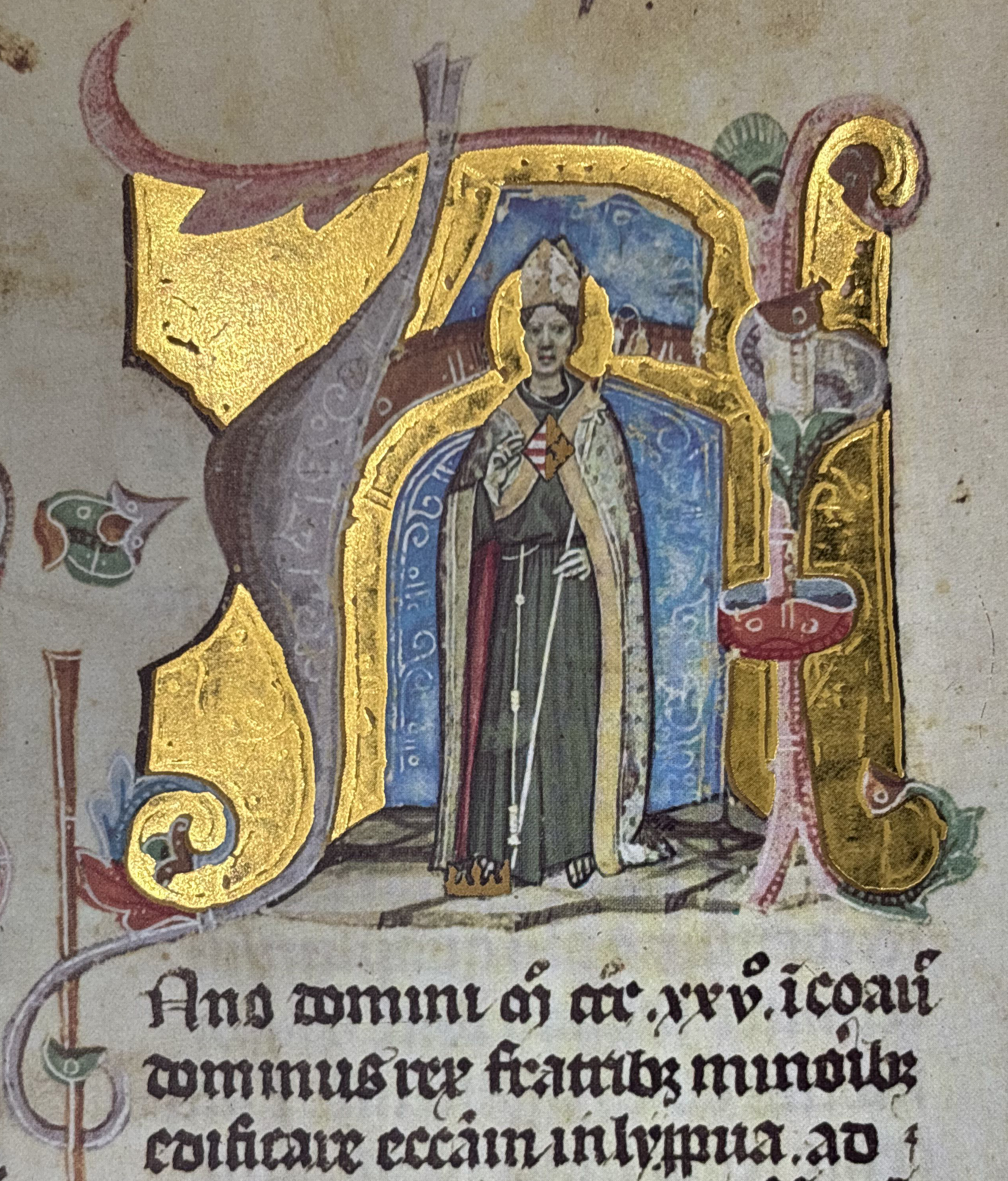
Saint Louis of Toulouse. He raises his right hand in blessing and the royal crown lies at his feet, symbolizing the fact that he renounced the Kingdom of Naples by taking Holy Orders. The Hungarian Anjou coat of arms is on his breast. (Chronicon Pictum, 1358)

Louis can be recognized in iconography as a young bishop, usually wearing a brown or grey Franciscan habit under his cope. The cope is usually decorated with the French fleur-de-lys. Sometimes there is a discarded crown by his feet.

A polyphonic motet, Flos/Celsa/Quam magnus pontifex, was written in honor of Louis's canonization in 1317. The piece appears anonymously in the Ivrea Codex and has been attributed by modern scholars to Philippe de Vitry.

Mission San Luis Obispo de Tolosa, a Franciscan mission in California founded in 1772, is named for him as are the surrounding city and county of San Luis Obispo, California. Kolleg St Ludwig in Vlodrop, the Netherlands, was dedicated to him. A Vlodrop hotel is also named for Saint Ludwig.

== Sources ==
- Arnold, John H. (2014). The Oxford Handbook of Medieval Christianity. OUP Oxford. ISBN 9780191015014.
- Brunner, Melanie (2011). "Poverty and Charity: Pope John XXII and the canonization of Louis of Anjou". Franciscan Studies. 69.
- Cusato, Michael F.; Geltner, Guy (2009). Defenders and Critics of Franciscan Life: Essays in Honor of John V. Fleming. BRILL. ISBN 978-9004176300.
- Giger, Andreas (2001). "Ludovicus Sanctus". In Root, Deane L. (ed.). The New Grove Dictionary of Music and Musicians. Oxford University Press.
- Grieco, Holli J. (2013). "In Some Way Even More than Before: Approaches to Understanding St. Louis of Anjou, Franciscan Bishop of Toulouse". In Jansen, Katherine L.; Geltner, G.; Lester, Anne E. (eds.). Center and Periphery: Studies on Power in the Medieval World in Honor of William Chester Jordan. Brill.
- Johnson, Timothy (2007). Franciscans at Prayer. BRILL. ISBN 9789047419891.
- Kekewich, Margaret L. (2008). The Good King: René of Anjou and Fifteenth Century Europe. Palgrave Macmillan.
- Klaniczay, Gábor (2002). Holy Rulers and Blessed Princesses: Dynastic Cults in Medieval Central Europe. Cambridge University Press.
- Murray, Linda; Murray, Peter; Jones, Tom Devonshire, eds. (2013). "Louis of Toulouse, Saint". The Oxford Dictionary of Christian Art and Architecture. Oxford University Press.
- Musto, Ronald G. (2003). Apocalypse in Rome: Cola di Rienzo and the Politics of the New Age. University of California Press.
- Pryds, Darleen N. (2000). The King embodies the world: Robert d'Anjou and the politics of preaching. BRILL. ISBN 9004114025.
- Tolan, John V. (2009). Saint Francis and the Sultan: The Curious History of a Christian-Muslim Encounter. OUP Oxford. ISBN 9780199239726.
- Toynbee, Margaret (1929). S. Louis of Toulouse and the Process of Canonisation in the Fourteenth Century. Manchester University Press.

Catholic Church titles
Preceded by Bérard de Got	Archbishop of Lyon; 1290–1295	Followed by Louis de Villars
Preceded by Hugues Mascaron	Bishop of Toulouse; 1296-1297	Followed by Arnaud-Roger de Comminges
