= Second Partition =

Second Partition may refer to:

- Second Partition of Poland, 1793
- Second Partition of Luxembourg, 1795
- Partition of Bengal (1947), partition of Bengal as part of the partition of India into West Bengal, India and East Bengal, Pakistan (later East Pakistan and now Bangladesh)
