= Third Partition =

Third Partition may refer to:

- Third Partition of Poland, 1795
- Third Partition of Luxembourg, 1839
