= Vlodrop-station =

Hamlet in Limburg Province, Netherlands

- Hamlet
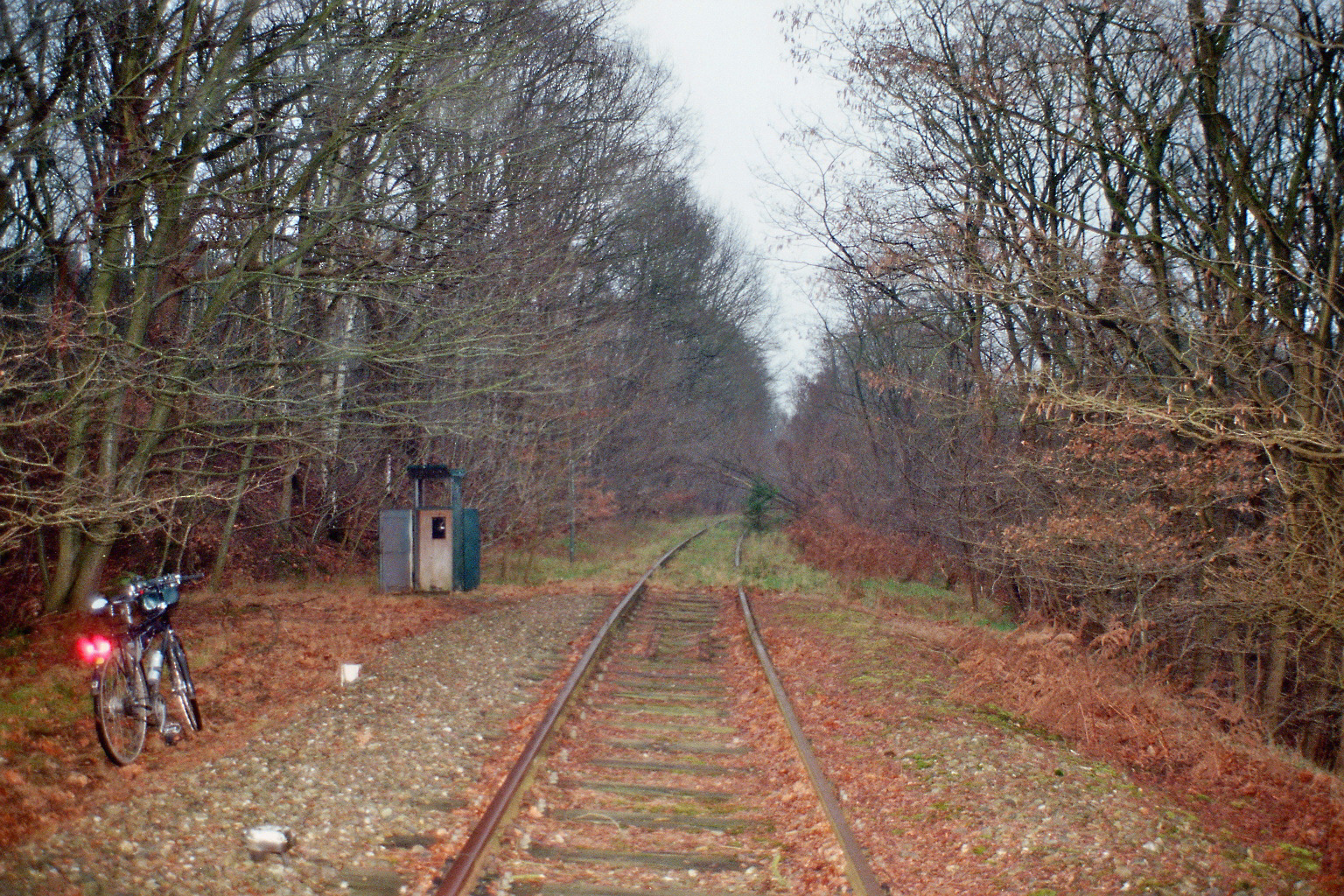
- Former railway line

- Location in the Netherlands Location in the province of Limburg in the Netherlands
- Coordinates: 51°9′6″N 6°9′0″E
- Country: Netherlands
- Province: Limburg
- Municipality: Roerdalen

Area
  - Total: 0.01 km^{2} (0.0039 sq mi)

Population (2021)
  - Total: 10
  - Density: 1,000/km^{2} (2,600/sq mi)
- Time zone: UTC+1 (CET)
  - Summer (DST): UTC+2 (CEST)
- Postal code: 6063
- Dialing code: 0475

Vlodrop-station (Limburgish and town dialect: Vlórp-Statie) is a hamlet in the Dutch province of Limburg. It is located on the German border, about 5 km (3.1 mi) east of the village Vlodrop, in the municipality of Roerdalen.

The hamlet is named after the railway station of Vlodrop, which was located on the Iron Rhine connection between Antwerp, Belgium, and locations in Germany. The location was chosen because the Belgian owners of the railway line could get free land there, and because of the proximity to the border meant that customs officers had extra powers. The station was bombed in 1944, and never rebuilt.
