= Sumer, Vidisha =

Coordinates: 23.625°N 77.880°E

For the town located in Sagar district of Madhya Pradesh, please see Sumer, Sagar.

Sumer is a town in Vidisha district of Madhya Pradesh, India.
