= Treaty of London (1839) =

Treaty over Belgium and Luxembourg

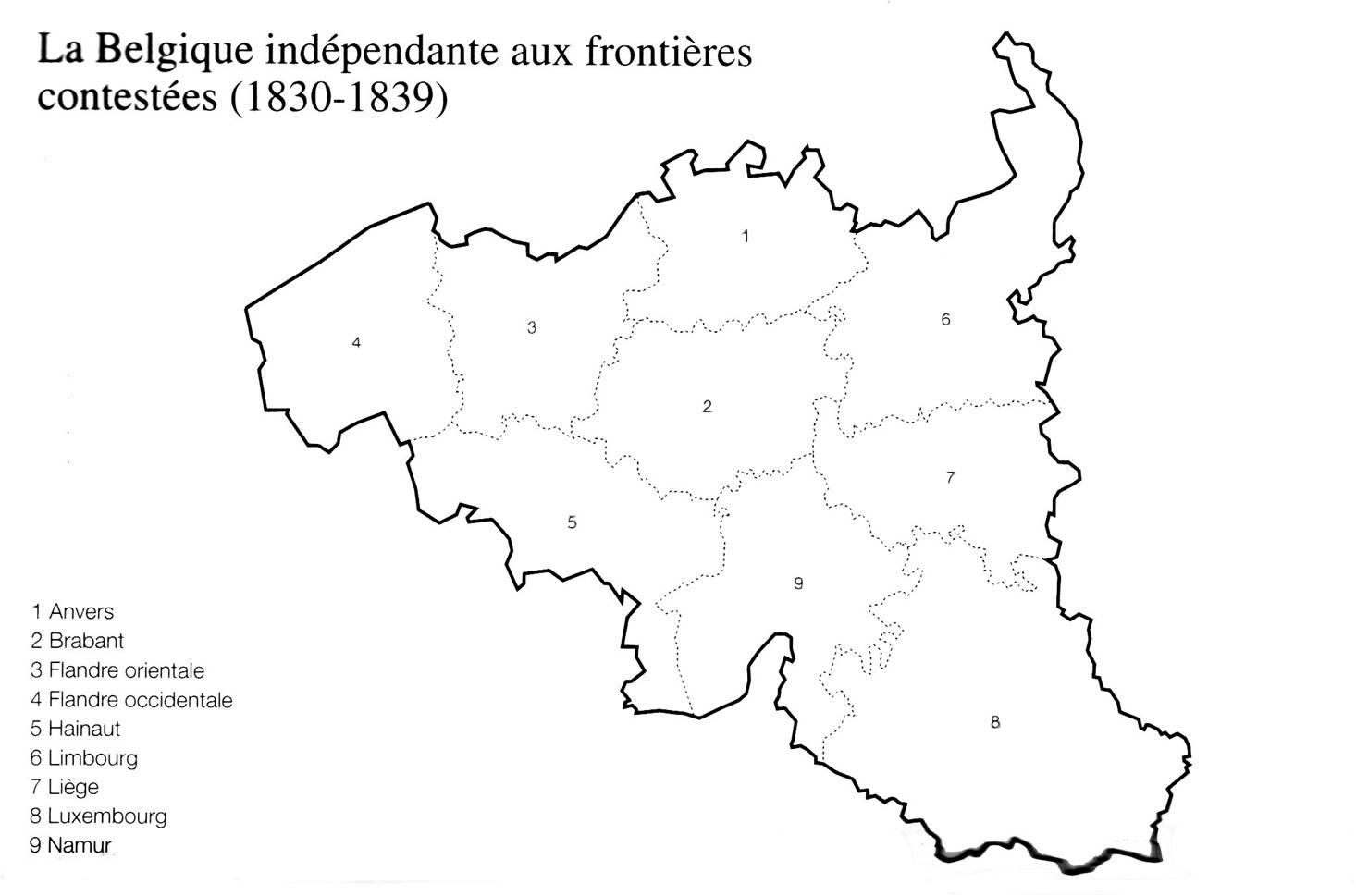
- Belgian borders claimed before the Treaty.
- Type: Multilateral Treaty
- Signed: 19 April 1839
- Location: London, United Kingdom of Great Britain and Ireland
- Original signatories: Austrian Empire; Belgium; July Monarchy; German Confederation; United Kingdom of the Netherlands; Russian Empire; United Kingdom of Great Britain and Ireland
- Ratifiers: Austria; Belgium; France; German Confederation; Netherlands; Russia; United Kingdom

The Treaty of London of 1839, was signed on 19 April 1839 between the major European powers, the United Kingdom of the Netherlands, and the Kingdom of Belgium. It was a direct follow-up to the 1831 Treaty of the XVIII Articles, which the Netherlands had refused to sign, and the result of negotiations at the London Conference of 1838–1839 which sought to maintain the Concert of Europe.

Under the treaty, the European powers recognised and guaranteed the independence and neutrality of Belgium and established the full independence of the German-speaking part of Luxembourg. Article VII required Belgium to remain perpetually neutral. Following the German invasion of 1914, Belgium abandoned its policy of neutrality (except for a brief, unsuccessful resumption from 1936 to 1940).

== Background ==
Since 1815, Belgium had been a reluctant part of the United Kingdom of the Netherlands. In 1830, Belgians broke away and established an independent Kingdom of Belgium. The overwhelmingly Catholic population could not accept the Dutch king's favouritism toward Protestantism, while French-speakers were irritated by his disdain for the French language, and the middle classes objected to the Dutch monopolisation of public offices. Liberals regarded King William I's rule as despotic, while there were high levels of unemployment and industrial unrest among the working classes.

Small-scale fighting – the death of some 600 volunteers is commemorated in the Place des Martyrs, Brussels – was followed by an international settlement in 1831. However the settlement was not accepted by the Dutch, who invaded the country in the autumn of 1831; and it took a French army recapturing Antwerp in 1832 before Belgium and the Netherlands could even agree an armistice. Several years later, the Netherlands recognised that they stood to gain more territory by accepting the 1831 settlement than from a mere continuance of the armistice. The Belgian government protested, with French support, against the late implementation of the settlement terms, but Britain accepted the Dutch claim; and in 1839, the Dutch accepted Belgian independence (and regained the disputed territories) by the Treaty of London. At the same time, the major powers all guaranteed Belgium's independence from the Netherlands.

== Territorial consequences ==
With the treaty, the southern provinces of the Netherlands, independent de facto since 1830, became internationally recognised as the Kingdom of Belgium, while the Province of Limburg was split into Belgian and Dutch parts.

The Grand Duchy of Luxemburg was in a personal union with the Netherlands and simultaneously a member of the German Confederation. The treaty partitioned the grand duchy. It lost two-thirds of its territory to Belgium's new Province of Luxembourg. The partitioning left a rump grand duchy, covering one-third of the original territory and inhabited by one-half of the original population, in personal union with the Netherlands, under King-Grand Duke William I (and subsequently William II and William III). This arrangement was confirmed by the 1867 Treaty of London, known as the 'Second Treaty of London' in reference to the 1839 treaty, and lasted until the death of King-Grand Duke William III 23 November 1890.

The treaty also indirectly affected Neutral Moresnet. To resolve this zinc dispute without issue, Prussia and Netherlands (later the German Empire and Belgium) agreed to establish a neutral condominium in 1816, jointly administering the area and sharing the profits from the mine. The territory became semi-autonomous, enjoying certain privileges like its own local governance and usage of multiple languages in administration, primarily addressed the formal recognition of Belgian independence from the Netherlands as preserving its semi-autonomous and neutral status. While Belgium gained recognition as an independent state with defined borders, Neutral Moresnet's unique neutrality was reaffirmed. The treaty ensured that this tiny enclave would remain jointly overseen by Belgium and Prussia, preserving its neutral status.

== Belgian neutrality ==
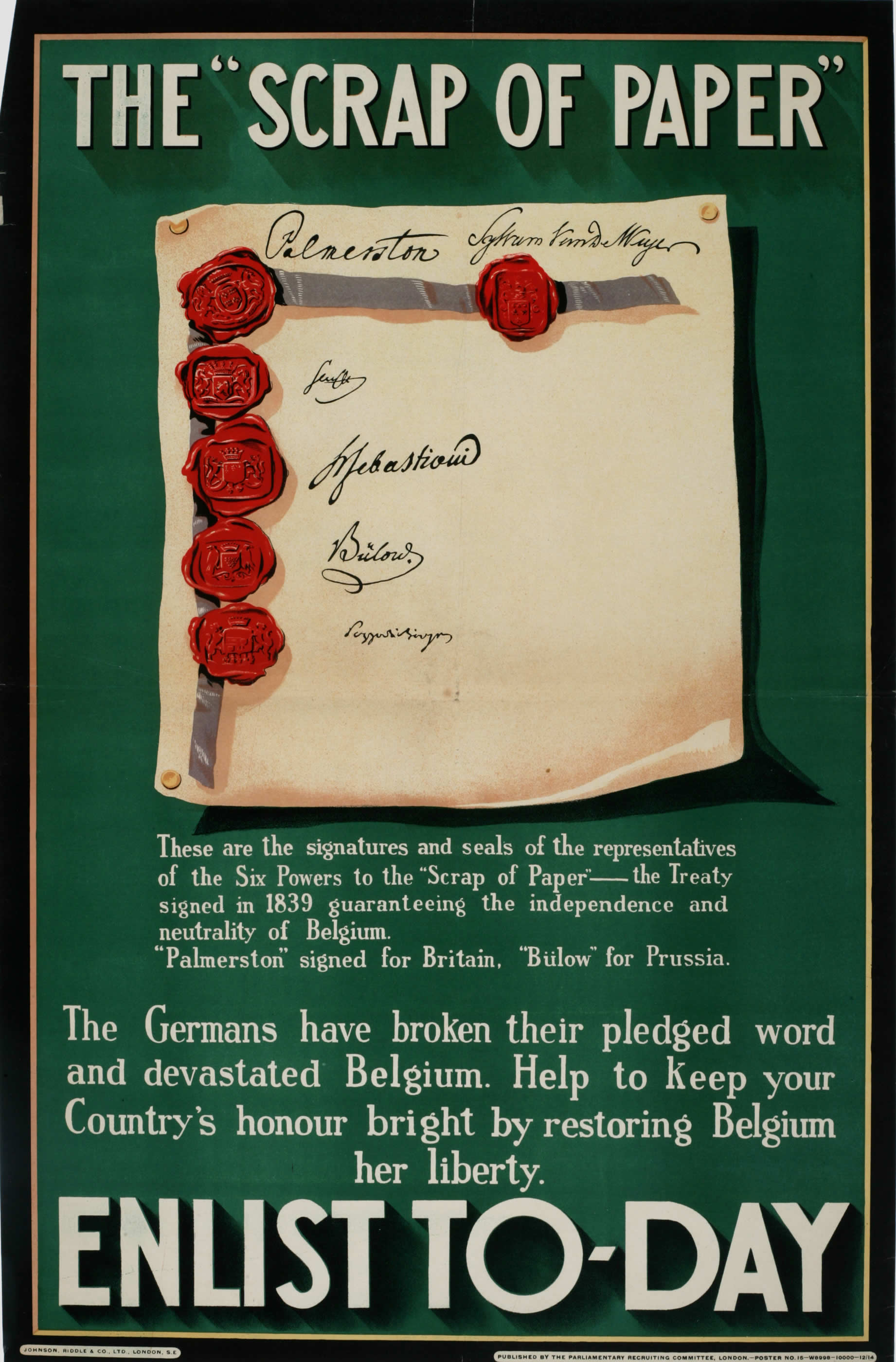
"The Scrap of Paper – Enlist Today", a British World War I recruitment poster of 1914, Canadian War Museum. The "Bülow" mentioned is Heinrich von Bülow, Prussian ambassador to Britain.

Belgium's de facto independence had been established through nine years of intermittent fighting in the 1830s against The Netherlands. The co-signatories of the Treaty of London recognised the independent Kingdom of Belgium. The five great powers of Europe (Austria, France, Prussia, Russia, and the United Kingdom) also pledged to guarantee Belgium's neutrality.

The treaty was a fundamental "lawmaking" treaty that became a cornerstone of European international law; it was especially important in the causes of World War I. On 31 July 1914, the mobilisation of the Belgian Army was ordered and the Belgian king publicly called Europe's attention to the fact that Germany, Great Britain and France were legally bound to defend the neutrality of his country. When the German Empire invaded Belgium in August 1914 despite the treaty, after an unanswered ultimatum Britain declared war on 4 August. Informed by the British ambassador that Britain would go to war with Germany over the latter's violation of Belgian neutrality, German Chancellor Theobald von Bethmann Hollweg exclaimed that he could not believe that Britain and Germany would be going to war over a mere "scrap of paper".

According to the historian Christopher Clark, Britain's decision to go to war was heavily influenced by fears that if they did not help France resist a German invasion it could usher in a period of German hegemony in Western Europe. Clark points out that the British cabinet agreed in a meeting on 29 July 1914 that although Britain was a signatory to the Treaty of London, the terms of the treaty did not oblige the British to oppose a German invasion of Belgium with military force. However, according to Isabel V. Hull:

Annika Mombauer correctly sums up the current historiography: “Few historians would still maintain that the ‘rape of Belgium’ was the real motive for Britain’s declaration of war on Germany.” Instead, the role of Belgian neutrality is variously interpreted as an excuse to mobilize the public, to provide embarrassed radicals in the cabinet with a justification for abandoning their principled pacifism and thus for staying in office, or, in the more conspiratorial versions, to cover for naked imperial interests. Denigrating the importance of Belgian neutrality appeals particularly to those who believe that Britain should never have entered the war, or indeed that the war should never have been fought; the basis for this view is the belief that Imperial Germany was not a danger either to Britain’s security or to Europe’s. Significantly, specialists in German history do not generally share these views.

== Iron Rhine ==
The Treaty of London also guaranteed Belgium the right of transit by rail or canal over Dutch territory as an outlet to the German Ruhr. This right was reaffirmed in a 24 May 2005 ruling of the Permanent Court of Arbitration in a dispute between Belgium and the Netherlands on the railway track.

In 2004 Belgium requested a reopening of the Iron Rhine railway. This was the result of the increasing transport of goods between the port of Antwerp and the German Ruhr Area. As part of the European policy of modal shift on the increasing traffic of goods, transport over railway lines and waterways was now preferred over road transport. The Belgian request was based on the treaty of 1839, and the Iron Rhine Treaty of 1873. After a series of failed negotiations, the Belgian and Dutch governments agreed to take the issue to the Permanent Court of Arbitration and respect its ruling in the case.

In a ruling of 24 May 2005, the court acknowledged both the Belgian rights under the cessation treaty of 1839 and the Dutch concerns for part of the Meinweg National Park nature reserve. The 1839 treaty still applied, the court found, giving Belgium the right to use and modernise the Iron Rhine. However, Belgium would be obliged to finance the modernisation of the line, while the Netherlands had to fund the repairs and maintenance of the route. Both countries were to share the costs of a tunnel beneath the nature reserve.

== In media ==
- A Scrap of Paper, comedic short film by Fatty Arbuckle

== See also ==
- Luxembourg and the Belgian Revolution
- List of treaties
- Treaty of Maastricht (1843)
- Treaties of London
- Schlieffen Plan
