= Sumarian =

Sumarian is a misspelling and may refer to:

- Sumerian
- Samaria or Samaritans
