= Sumerpur (disambiguation) =

Sumerpur is a city in Rajasthan, India.

Sumerpur may also refer to:

== Entities named after Sumerpur ==
- Sumerpur Tehsil, a division of Pali district, Rajasthan
- Sumerpur Assembly constituency, a constituency in the Rajasthan Legislative Assembly

== Other places ==
- Sumerpur, Mainpuri, a village in Mainpuri district, Uttar Pradesh
- Sumerpur, Unnao, a hamlet in Unnao district, Uttar Pradesh
- Sumerpur, Uttar Pradesh, a town in Hamirpur district, Uttar Pradesh

== See also ==
- Sumeru (disambiguation)
- Sumer (disambiguation)
- Pur (disambiguation)
