= Sumeria (disambiguation) =

Sumeria, or Sumer, is the earliest known civilization.

Sumeria may also refer to:

- 1970 Sumeria, a minor planet
- "Sumeria", a song on the 2011 album Deconstruction by Canadian musician Devin Townsend

== See also ==
- Sumerian (disambiguation)
- Sumer (disambiguation)
- Samaria
