= Iron Rhine Treaty =

1873 treaty between Belgium and the Netherlands

Treaty between Belgium and the Netherlands to regulate the passage of a railway from Antwerp to Gladbach through the territory of Limburg
- Signed: 13 January 1873
- Location: Brussels, Belgium
- Original signatories: (Belgium) Guillaume d'Aspremont Lynden (Belgium) Jules Malou (Netherlands) Johan Wilhelm van Lansberge
- Parties: Belgium Netherlands
- Language: French

The Iron Rhine Treaty (1873) was a treaty between Belgium and the Netherlands regarding the passage of the international Iron Rhine railway line from Antwerp (Belgium) to Mönchengladbach (Germany) over Dutch territory in Limburg (the Netherlands). This put into effect a Belgian right to access to Germany through Dutch territory established in the 1839 Treaty of London. The railway line, generally known as the "Iron Rhine", was to be run as a concession by the Belgian Compagnie du Nord. The treaty also ended the annual payments of 400,000 florins due to the Netherlands from Belgium under the treaty of 5 November 1842, in return for payment of 8,900,000 florins in quarterly instalments over the course of a year. It furthermore modified the duty on Dutch spirits.

The agreement was signed in Brussels on 13 January 1873, by Guillaume d'Aspremont Lynden and Jules Malou, the Belgian ministers of Foreign Affairs and Finance respectively, and Johan Wilhelm van Lansberge, the Dutch ambassador in Brussels. Ratifications were exchanged in Brussels on 18 June 1873.

On 19 June the Belgian parliament passed a bill giving legal force to the treaty and empowering the Belgian government to issue government bonds at 3 per cent interest to raise the 18,750,000 Belgian francs necessary.

The railway fell into disuse after 1991, but in 2004 the Belgian government again sought to exercise its treaty right to railway access to Germany over Dutch territory, resulting in a 2005 ruling of the Permanent Court of Arbitration in The Hague that such a right can still be exercised.
