= Treaty of the Eighteen Articles =

1831 proposed treaty between Belgium and the Netherlands

The Treaty of the Eighteen Articles was a proposal for a treaty between Belgium and the Netherlands to establish borders between the two countries.

The initial proposal was finalised in London on 26 June 1831.

== Background ==
The Belgian Revolution of 1830 challenged the territorial settlement of the Congress of Vienna, and - with French support for Belgium, but the opposition of the other continental Great Powers - threatened another continent-wide war.

A conference was therefore organised in London, where France and England took the lead in arbitrating a solution.

== Outcome ==
Among the more controversial issues debated in London 1830-1 were the financial settlement between the newly independent Belgium and Holland, and the territorial issue, with the disposal of Luxemburg and Limburg being especially inflammatory elements.

Though the Treaty of Eighteen Articles (as set out in July 1831) was accepted by Belgium, it failed due to the resistance of the Dutch monarch William I, who swiftly invaded Belgium in the Ten Days Campaign. Although the Great Powers intervened to force an armistice, the terms of the Treaty were revised in Dutch favour, to create the Treaty of Twenty-Four Articles. It was to those revised terms that the Dutch were to appeal at the end of the decade, in order to obtain the Luxemburg/Limburg territory allocated them therein, but previously retained still under Belgian control.

A new Conference saw the Eighteen Articles succeeded by the Treaty of London, incorporating the Treaty of the Twenty-Four Articles of October 1831.

== See also ==
- Benelux
- List of treaties
- Rattachism
