= Sumerian =

Sumerian or Sumerians may refer to:

- Sumer, an ancient civilization
  - Sumerian language
  - Sumerian art
  - Sumerian architecture
  - Sumerian literature
  - Cuneiform script, used in Sumerian writing
- Sumerian Records, an American record label based in Washington, D.C., and Los Angeles

== See also ==
- Sumeria (disambiguation)
- Sumer (disambiguation)
- Sumarian (disambiguation)
