= Mount Meru (disambiguation) =

Mount Meru, or Sumeru, is the sacred five-peaked mountain of Hindu, Jain, and Buddhist cosmology.

Mount Meru or Sumeru may also refer to:

- Mount Meru (Buddhism), the central world-mountain in Buddhist cosmology
- Mount Meru (Tanzania), an active stratovolcano
- Mount Meru University, Arusha, Tanzania
- Sumeru (film), 2021 Indian romantic film
- Sumeru Parbat, mountain in Uttarakhand, India
- Semeru, a mountain in Indonesia, with name derived from the Hindu-Buddhist mythical mountain of Meru or Sumeru, the abode of gods
- Mount Kailash, a peak in the Kailash Range, also known as Meru Parvat or Sumeru
- Sumeru, a region in Genshin Impact

== See also ==
- Meru (disambiguation)
- Mahameru (disambiguation)
- Sumer (disambiguation)
- Sumerpur (disambiguation)
