= Mahameru =

Mahameru may refer to:

- Mount Meru, sacred mountain of Hindu, Buddhist and Jain cosmology
- A 3D representation of the Sri Yantra, a mystical diagram in Tantric Hinduism
- Semeru, a volcano in Java, Indonesia

== See also ==
- Mount Meru (disambiguation)
- Meru (disambiguation)
