= Sumuru (disambiguation) =

Sumuru is a supervillainess protagonist of the 1946 radio series Shadow of Sumuru (1946), and subsequent novels by Sax Rohmer.

Sumuru may also refer to:

- Šumuru, one of the eight great clans of Manchu nobility
- Sumuru (2003 film), a 2003 sci-fi film
- The Akkadian name for Sumur, a Phoenician city in the Levant
