= Coalition war =

System of warfare

A coalition war, also known as coalition warfare, is a conflict that includes the cooperation between multiple states on the same side in a war effort when they are not part of a military alliance.

Notable examples include:

Great Northern War, in which the Anti-Swedish Coalition won.

French Revolutionary and Napoleonic Wars, often referred to as the wars of the coalitions.

The Gulf War, with the Coalition of the Gulf War.

The Campaign against Dong Zhuo, near the end of the Han Dynasty.
