= Sumer, Bhopal =

Sumer
- village
- Location within Madhya Pradesh Location within India
- Coordinates: 23.709377°N 77.189964°E
- Country: India
- State: Madhya Pradesh
- District: Bhopal
- Tehsil: Berasia

Population (2011)
  - Total: 217
- Time zone: UTC+5:30 (IST)
- ISO 3166 code: MP-IN
- Census code: 482083

Sumer is a village in the Bhopal district of Madhya Pradesh, India. It is located in the Berasia tehsil.

== Demographics ==
According to the 2011 census of India, Sumer has 33 households. The effective literacy rate (i.e. the literacy rate of population excluding children aged 6 and below) is 44.71%.

Demographics (2011 Census)
	Total	Male	Female
Population	217	103	114
Children aged below 6 years	47	21	26
Scheduled caste	0	0	0
Scheduled tribe	0	0	0
Literates	76	44	32
Workers (all)	110	54	56
Main workers (total)	42	39	3
Main workers: Cultivators	11	11	0
Main workers: Agricultural labourers	27	25	2
Main workers: Household industry workers	2	1	1
Main workers: Other	2	2	0
Marginal workers (total)	68	15	53
Marginal workers: Cultivators	11	0	11
Marginal workers: Agricultural labourers	55	13	42
Marginal workers: Household industry workers	0	0	0
Marginal workers: Others	2	2	0
Non-workers	107	49	58
