= Mweru =

Mweru may refer to:

- Lake Mweru - a lake on the border between Zambia and DR Congo
- Mweru-Luapula - a term for the Luapula River/Lake Mweru system, valley or geographical area
- Lake Mweru Wantipa - a small lake between Lake Mweru and Lake Tanganyika
- Mweru (constituency) - a constituency of the National Assembly of Zambia
- Mweru Marshes - an alternative name for Lake Mweru Wantipa in a periodic dry phase
- Mweru Wantipa National Park - a wildlife reserve on Lake Mweru Wantipa
