= Iron Rhine =

Freight railway between Belgium and Germany, through Netherlands

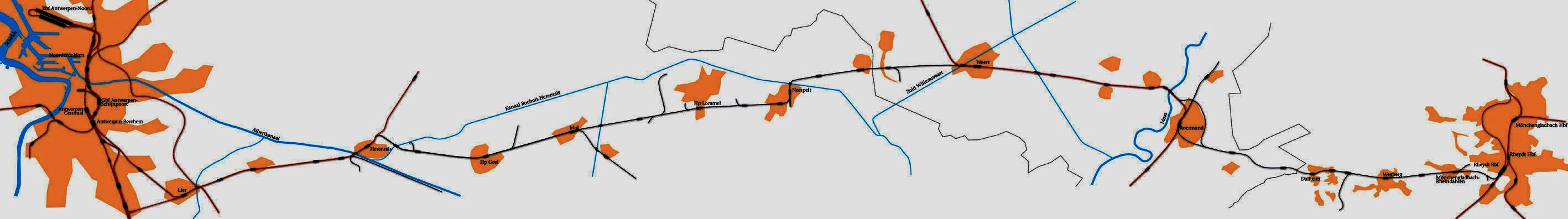

Overview
- Line number: 2524

Service
- Route number: 485, 487

Technical
- Line length: 123.2 kilometres (76.6 mi)
- Track gauge: 1,435 mm (4 ft 8 1/2 in)

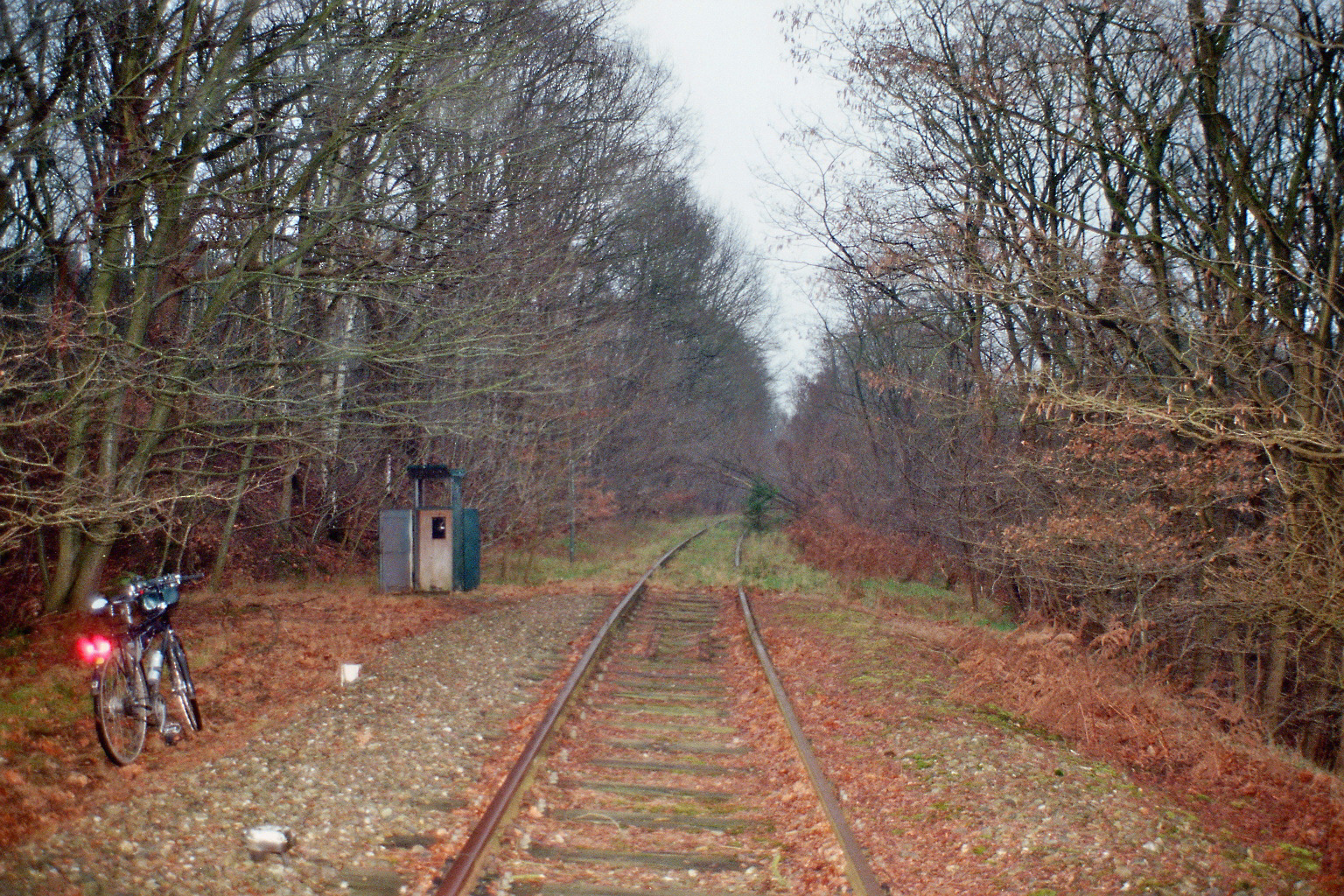
Iron Rhine

The Iron Rhine or Steel Rhine (Dutch: IJzeren Rijn; German: Eiserner Rhein) is a partially operational freight rail corridor connecting the port of Antwerp (Belgium) and Mönchengladbach (Germany) by way of Neerpelt and the Dutch towns of Weert and Roermond.

The Treaty of London between the Netherlands and Belgium in 1839 recognised the independence of Belgium. As part of the treaty, Belgium had the right to build a road or canal from Sittard to the Prussian border over Dutch territory, with Belgium funding the construction. This right was further established in the Iron Rhine Treaty of 1873. At first, Belgium planned to dig a canal, but in the end it opted for a railway.

In 1868, construction of the Iron Rhine started, and in 1879, the first trains used the railway. Initially, traffic was dense and frequent, but it decreased over time. Currently the railroad is used by some trains between Antwerp and the zinc factory in Budel, and between Budel and Weert. The line Weert - Roermond is part of the Dutch InterCity network, and is used daily by many trains. Between Roermond and the German border, traffic has fully ceased since 1991.

== Current operation ==
Although the 160.3 kilometers (99.6 mi) Iron Rhine is not fully operational, 134.8 km (83.8 mi) of its tracks are in regular use. 85 km (53 mi) of the route is double tracked and 55 km (34 mi) is electrified. However, the 16.5 kilometers (Roermond-Dalheim) are not operational and a further 9 km (5.6 mi) (Budel-Weert) are used only rarely. 200 m (660 ft) of track in Dalheim, on the German side is fully overgrown.

On the German section Mönchengladbach-Dalheim RegionalBahn trains run alongside freight trains, long distance travel no longer takes place on the German section. On the Belgian and Dutch side of the track the route is used extensively by InterCity - Interregio -, local and freight trains.

=== Germany ===
The Schwalm-Nette-Bahn (RB 34) traverses the line between Mönchengladbach Hbf and Dalheim, directly on the border with the Netherlands. It is operated by VIAS and runs every hour. The line runs through the territory of the Aachener Verkehrsverbund (AVV) and the Verkehrsverbund Rhein-Ruhr (VRR). The train stops only when needed at the Arsbeck and Mönchengladbach-Genhausen halts. VIAS uses railcars of type LINT 41 on the line. A resumption of cross-border passenger traffic between Dalheim and Roermond (with a Meinewegstation) is in the talks.

Freight transportation is provided for the Test- and Validationcenter Wegberg-Wildenrath near Arsbeck/Klinkum and used to be provided to a military base near Rheindahlen, which closed in 2013.

=== Netherlands ===
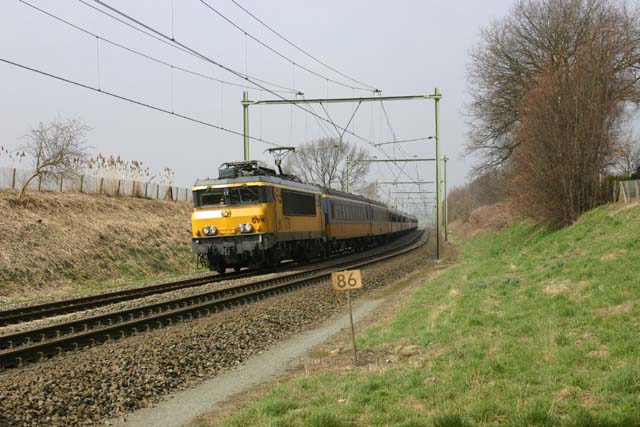
Iron Rhine in the Netherlands

The Dutch section between Weert-Roermond, since the abandonment of the stations Buggenum, Baexem-Heythuysen, and Kelpen in the 1940s, sees no more regional trains. The stations Roermond and Weert are connected with each other, however, by InterCity trains of the Netherlands Railways. These trains link Amsterdam and Schiphol with the South Limburgian cities Heerlen and Maastricht up to every ten minutes. Double-decker EMUs of type DD IRM are mainly used.

=== Belgium ===
Given its proximity to the large Belgian port city of Antwerp, freight and passenger traffic between Antwerp, Lier and Mol (the line branches here to Hasselt and Neerpelt) has always been relatively dense. The section between Mol and Neerpelt (inoperational after the Second World War) was, because of political pressure from the municipalities Lommel and Neerpelt, reactivated on 27 May 1978.

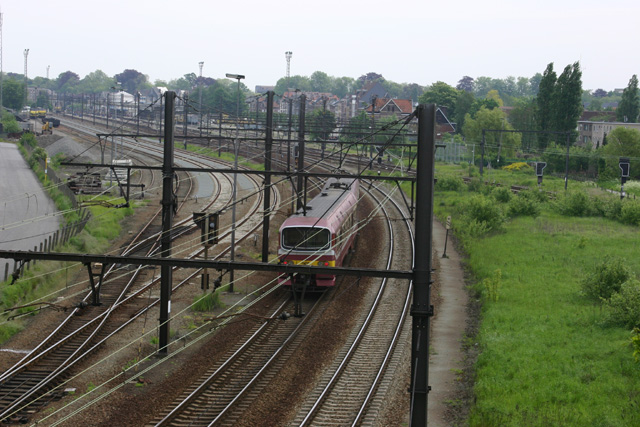
Iron Rhine in Belgium by Lier

A long-distance inter-regional line (IR e) connects Hamont with Antwerp every hour. The trains start in Hamont, combine in Mol with a train partition from (or to) Hasselt, (or on the way back splits) and travels via Herentals and Lier to Antwerpen Centraal. In Herentals a branch line connects to the city of Turnhout, which is served by two lines of the SNCB; the InterCity R and the Interregio g. The latter, hourly train, uses the same route Herentals–Lier–Antwerp as the Interregio e (Antwerp–Lier–Herentals–Mol–Hasselt/Neerpelt). The InterCity R, which also travels hourly, however, leaves the Iron Rhine in Lier, and reaches Brussels-Midi via Mechelen. The section Antwerp-Lier is also used by the Interregio c (Antwerp-Lier-Aarschot-Liege) and by local trains on the route Antwerp-Lier-Aarschot-Leuven. The service offering is reinforced along the trunk route of the Iron Rhine, with hourly local trains on the route Antwerp-Lier-Herentals-Mol serving smaller intermediate stations. In addition, the only during peak travel time circulating P-Train (Piekuurtrein / Train d'heure de pointe come) will also use the route. On weekends and holidays, the traffic is modest and the route will be run only by the IR e, the IR cand IR g at hourly intervals, whereas the IC-, P-, and L-trains do not run. Smaller stations will be serviced either by the IR gor not at all.

The rolling stock used by the IR e and P-and L-Trein are diesel trains of the NMBS Class 41. InterCity traffic use AM80 break-motor coaches and locomotive-hauled trains (HLE21/27) with M5 or M6 Bilevel rail cars. The IR g and IR c use AM80 Break-railcars and the L-Trein service Antwerp-Lier-Aarschot-Leuven use railcars of type NMBS Class AM 86-89.

== Reopening of border section ==
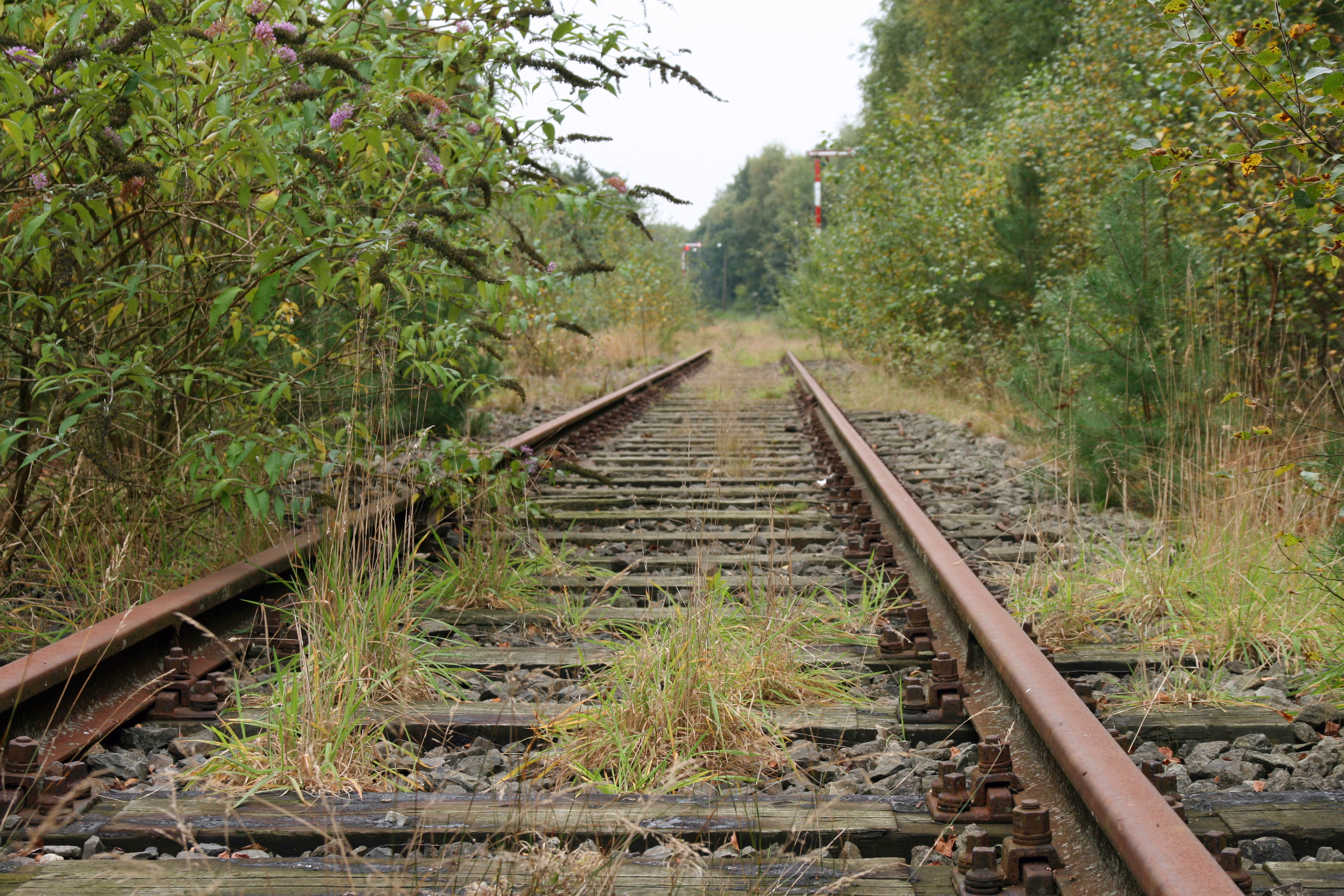
The Iron Rhine in Vlodrop

In 2004, Belgium requested a reopening of the Iron Rhine. The government stated it was the result of the increasing transport of goods between the port of Antwerp and the German Ruhr Area. As part of the European policy of modal shift on the increasing traffic of goods, transport over railway lines and waterways is preferred over road transport.

Currently Belgium uses the Montzenroute, south of the Iron Rhine, from Antwerp to Aachen via Aarschot, Hasselt, Tongeren and Montzen, for transportation of goods to Germany. High passenger traffic on parts of this route causes a lack of capacity for goods, and a number of steep inclines over the route make it problematic for long and heavy trains.

The Belgian request is based on the treaty of 1839, and the Iron Rhine Treaty of 1873. Critics felt that Belgium could not invoke these treaties, as the 1873 treaty granted Belgium a concession of 99 years on the Iron Rhine route, a period which ended in 1972. Furthermore, Belgium had sold the railroad to the Dutch Government. The argument that carries most weight in the Netherlands is that the railroad runs through the nature reserve of De Meinweg, and nature activists fear the destruction of the local habitat of several threatened species, whereas Belgian interests consider this to be a delaying tactic while the Netherlands completes the Betuwe line.

After a series of failed negotiations, the Belgian and Dutch governments agreed to take the issue to the Permanent Court of Arbitration and respect its ruling in the case. In its ruling of 24 May 2005, the court acknowledged both the Belgian rights under the cessation treaty of 1839 and the Dutch concerns for the nature reserve. The 1839 treaty still applies, the court found, giving Belgium the right to use and modernize the Iron Rhine. However, it has to finance the modernisation of the line, while the Netherlands have to fund the repairs and maintenance of the route. Both countries will split the costs of the construction of a tunnel beneath the nature reserve.

The reopening would allow heavier trains than on the Montzenroute (2000 tonnes in both directions compared to 800 and 1300 tonnes); and a shorter journey (162 km compared to 211 km); it would reopen some time after 2015. As of 2018, the Dutch and Belgian authorities remain discussing the route the Iron Rhine would take.

However on 11 May 2007, and again in 2013-2014, the Walloon Region opposed the project for fear of seeing employment go down in case of reduced traffic on the Montzenroute. At the end of 2014 an alternative route was proposed, using the existing lines Roermond – Venlo and Venlo – Mönchengladbach, which are in regular use, rather than clearing the historical route from its overgrown vegetation and protecting by tunnels and/or soundscreens the part of it crossing the Meinweg National Park. This alternative route would have the same advantages as the historical one but at half the cost. The need for the train to change direction in Roermond and again in Venlo could be solved easily, e.g. by temporarily adding an additional locomotive at its former "tail" end, to pull it on that part of the line.
