= Vlodrop =

Vlodrop Vlórp
- Village
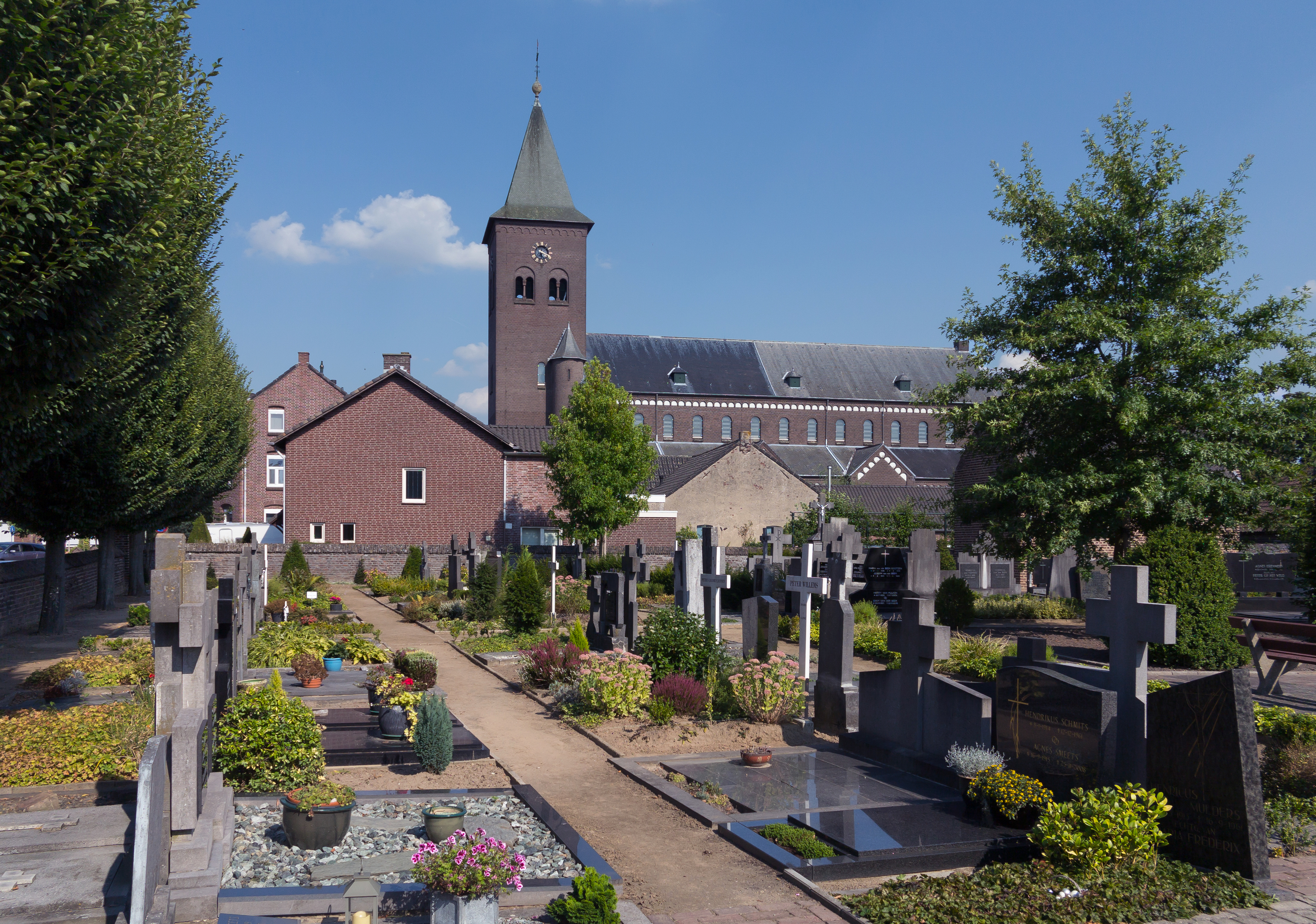
- St Martinus Church

- Flag Coat of arms

- Location in the Netherlands Location in the province of Limburg in the Netherlands
- Coordinates: 51°08′00″N 6°04′25″E
- Country: Netherlands
- Province: Limburg
- Municipality: Roerdalen

Area
  - Total: 18.59 km^{2} (7.18 sq mi)
- Elevation: 30 m (98 ft)

Population (2021)
  - Total: 2,000
  - Density: 110/km^{2} (280/sq mi)
- Time zone: UTC+1 (CET)
  - Summer (DST): UTC+2 (CEST)
- Postal code: 6063
- Dialing code: 0475

Vlodrop (Limburgish: Vlórp, pronounced [ˈvlʊʀ(ə)p]) is a village in the south-eastern part of The Netherlands in the municipality of Roerdalen. The village is situated near the German border, about 8 km southeast of Roermond.

== History ==
The village was first mentioned in 943 as Flothorp. The etymology is unclear. Vlodorp developed in the Middle Ages. In 1277, it became part of the Duchy of Gelre.

The Catholic St Martinus Church is a three aisled basilica-like church built between 1929 and 1930. It was severely damaged in 1945. The church was restored between 1946 and 1947, and the tower was rebuilt in 1954.

Castle Steenhuis is a manor house surrounded by a moat built in 1664 as a replacement of the medieval castle.

In 1879, Vlodrop-station opened on the Iron Rhine railway line. The line closed in 1944.

Vlodrop was a separate municipality until 1991, when it was merged with Melick en Herkenbosch.

In 1990, Maharishi Mahesh Yogi, founder of the Transcendental Meditation program, moved his headquarters to the grounds of the former monastery, Kolleg St. Ludwig and it became the home of Maharishi European Research University.

The world-famous roller coaster manufacturer Vekoma is based in Vlodrop.

== Gallery ==
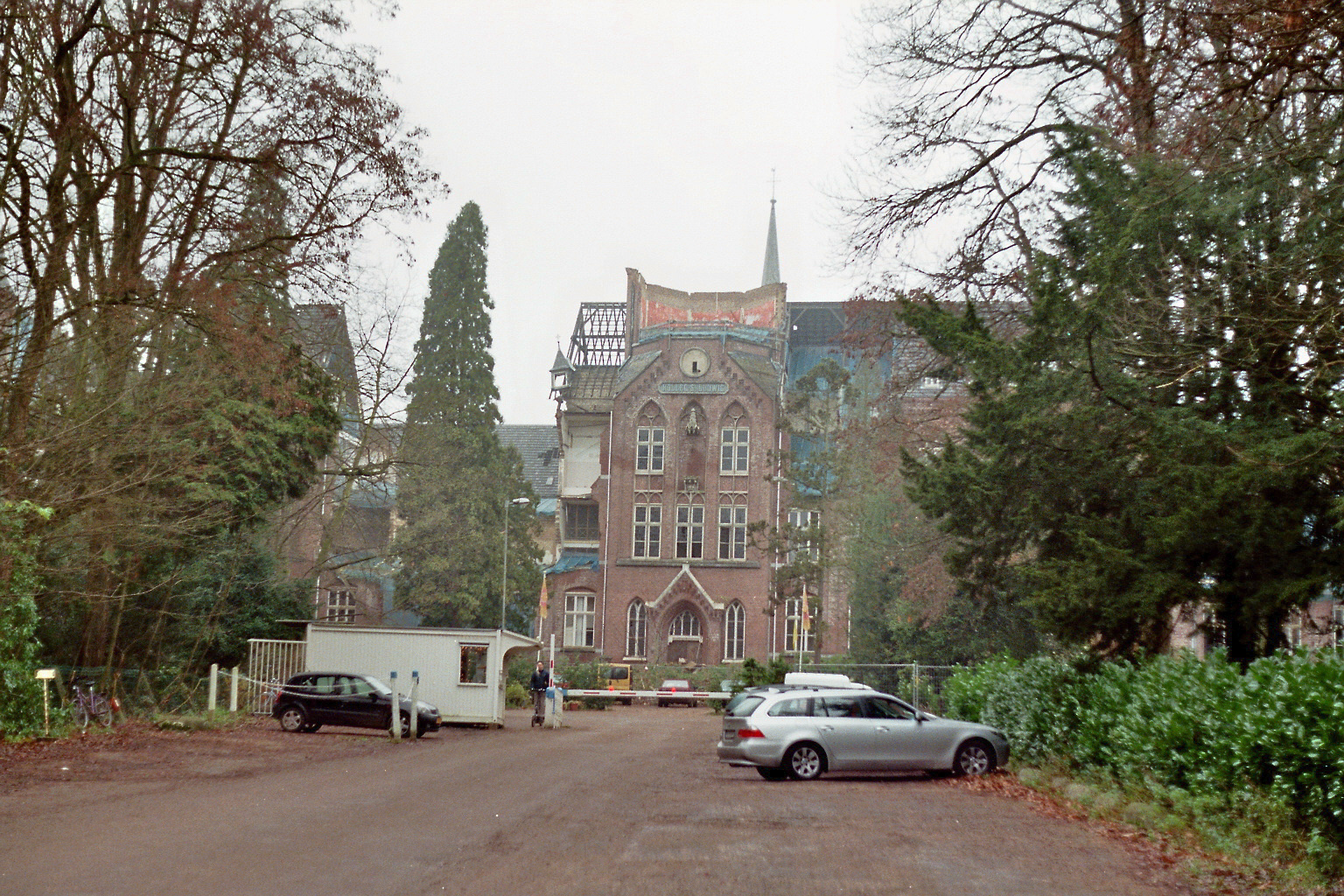
Kolleg St. Ludwig

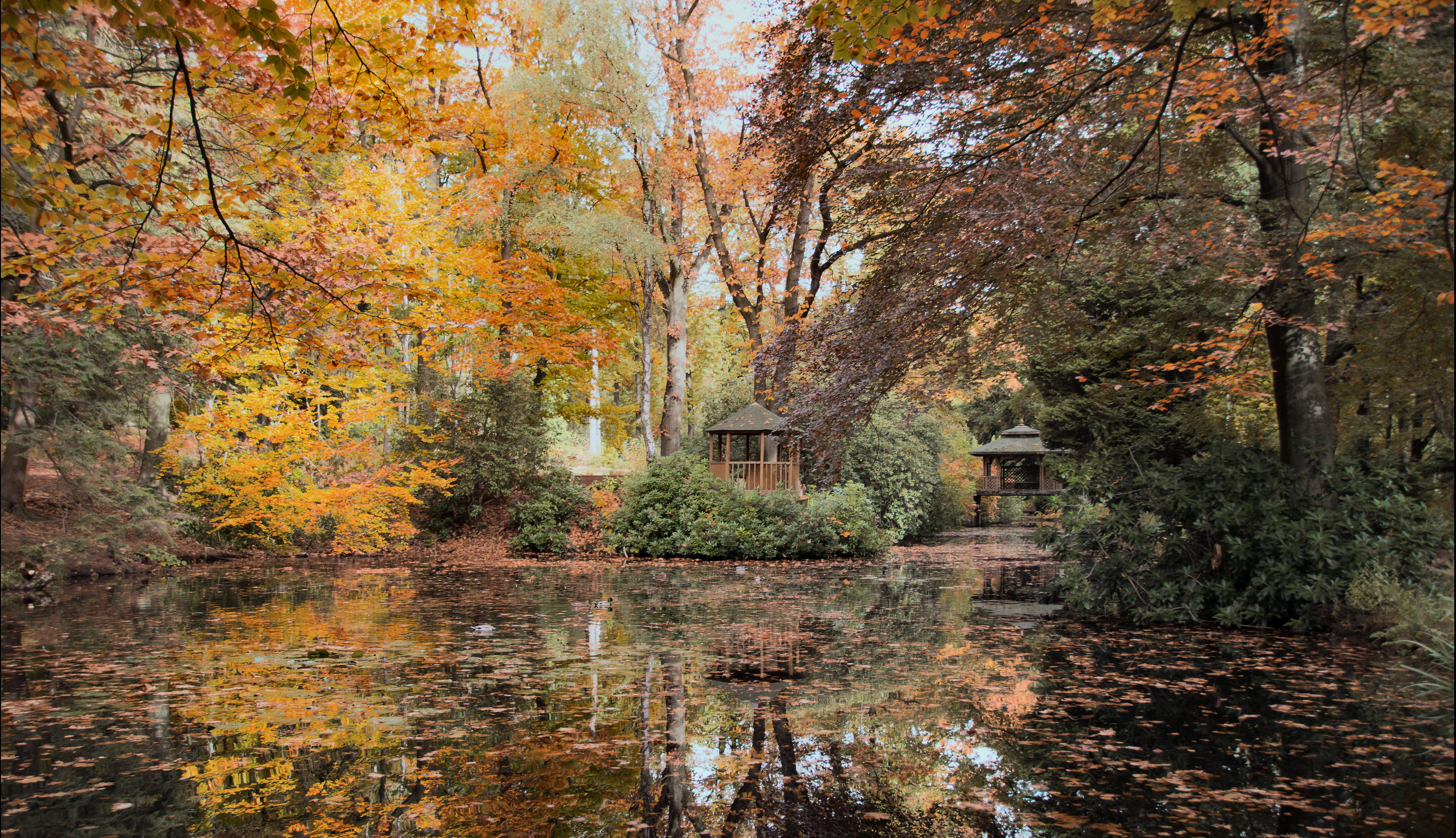
Gardens in Kolleg St. Ludwig

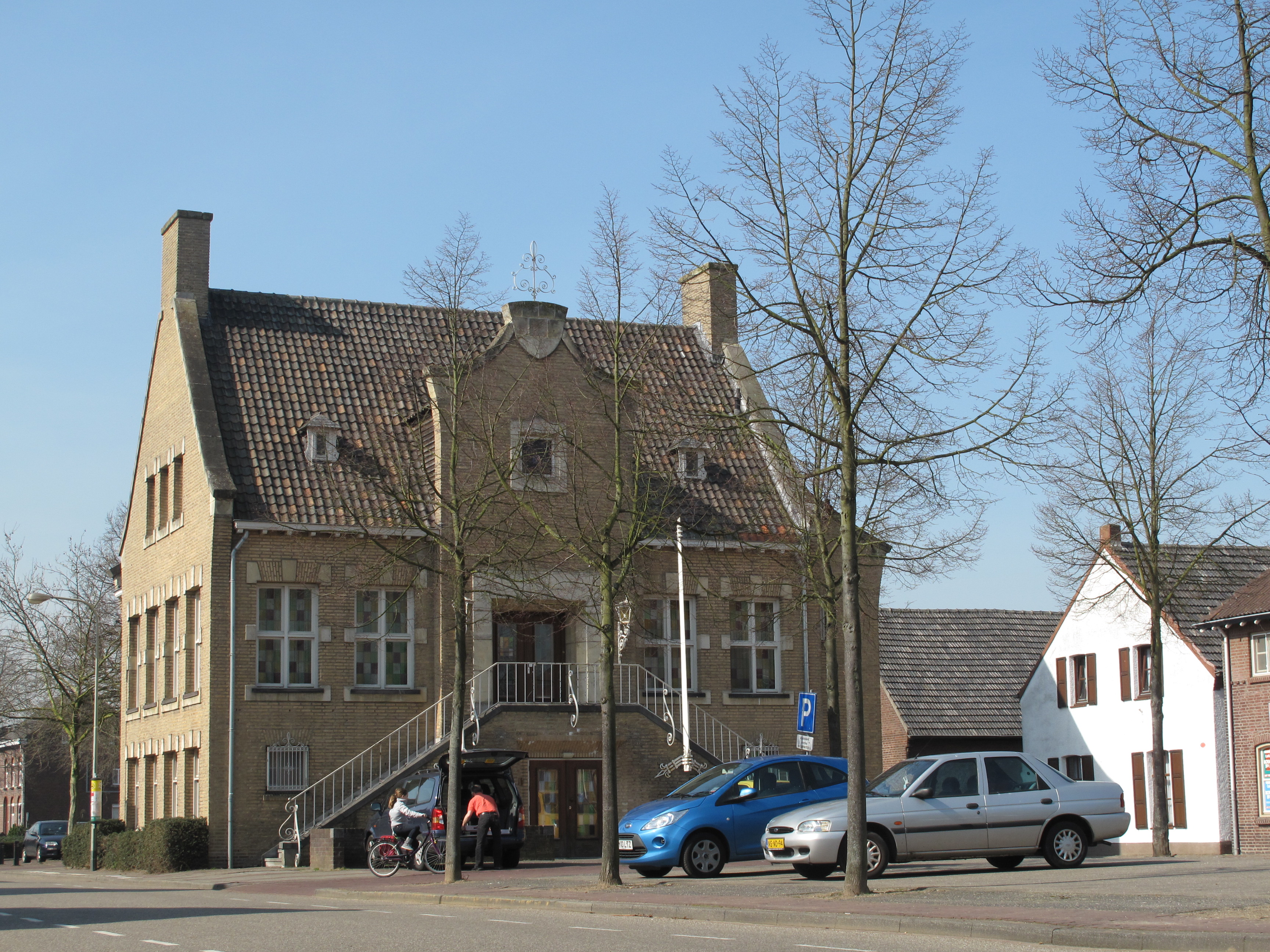
Monumental house

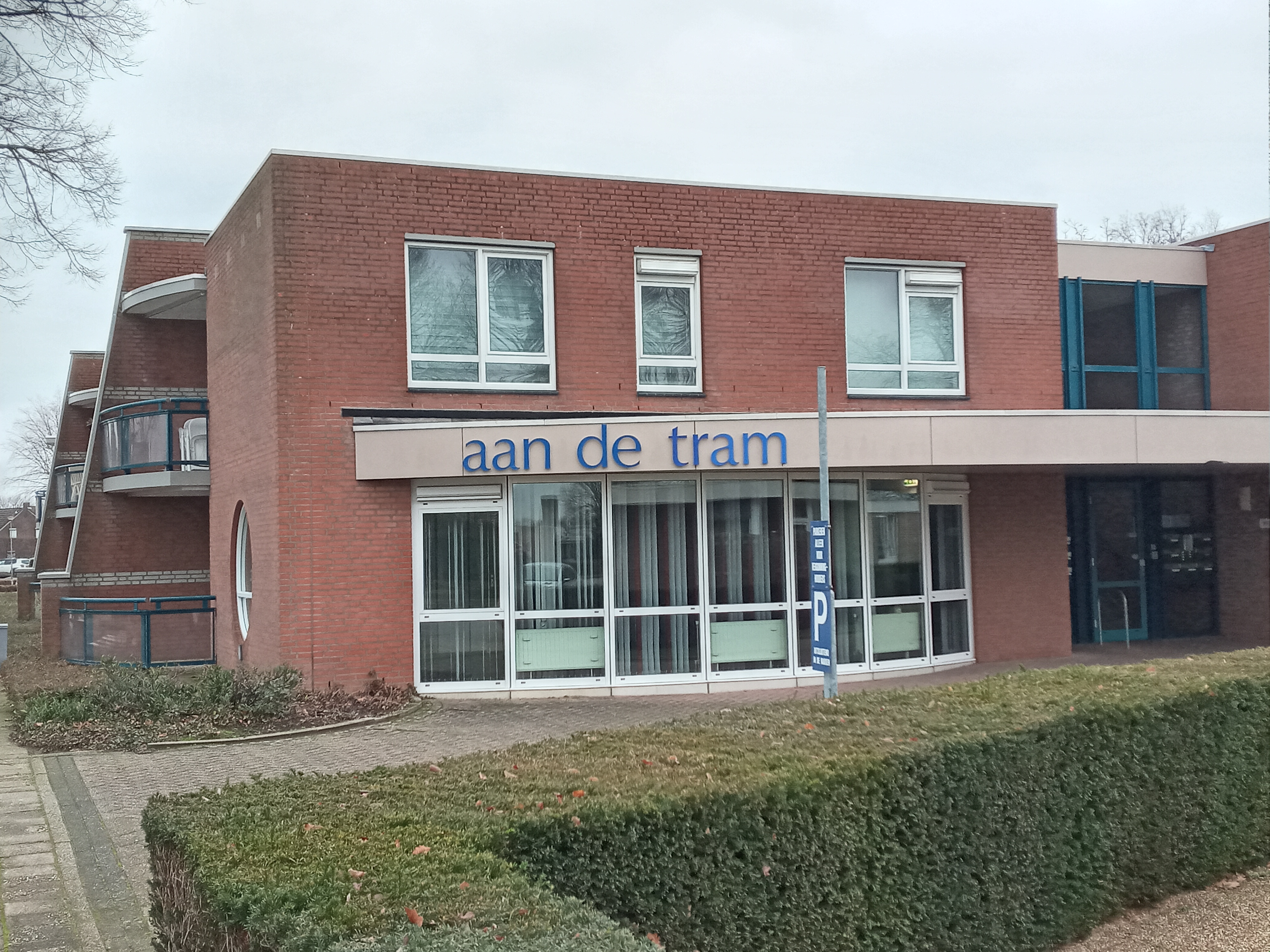
Retirement home
