= Sumer, Sagar =

Coordinates: 23.639°N 78.356°E

Sumer is a town in the Sagar district of Madhya Pradesh.
