= Partitions of Luxembourg =

Losses of territory of the Grand Duchy of Luxembourg (1659, 1815, 1839)

The three partitions of Luxembourg reduced Luxembourg's area substantially, to the advantage of the three surrounding countries. Borders of the Duchy of Luxembourg before 1659 Lost to France by the Treaty of the Pyrenees in 1659 Lost to Prussia by the Congress of Vienna in 1815 Lost to Belgium by the Treaty of London in 1839 Luxembourg after 1839

There were three Partitions of Luxembourg between 1659 and 1839. Together, the three partitions reduced the territory of the Duchy of Luxembourg from 10,700 km^{2} (4,100 sq mi) to the present-day area of 2,586 km^{2} (998 sq mi) over a period of 240 years. The remainder forms parts of modern-day Belgium, France, and Germany.

All three countries bordering Luxembourg have, at one point or another, sought the complete annexation of Luxembourg, but all such attempts have failed. Conversely, there have been historical movements to reverse Luxembourg's loss of territory, but none of these came to fruition, and Luxembourgish revanchism is only a fringe opinion today.

== First Partition ==
The first partition of Luxembourg occurred in 1659, when the Duchy of Luxembourg was in personal union with the Kingdom of Spain. During the Franco-Spanish War, France and England had captured much of the Spanish Netherlands. Under the Treaty of the Pyrenees, France received from Luxembourg the fortresses of Stenay, Thionville, and Montmédy, and the surrounding territory.

The area taken by France from the Duchy of Luxembourg totalled 1,060 km^{2} (410 sq mi). This area accounted for approximately one-tenth of area of the Duchy of Luxembourg at the time.

== Second Partition ==
In 1795, during the French Revolutionary Wars, Luxembourg was annexed to France as part of the département of Forêts. Upon the defeat of Napoleon, under the 1814 Treaty of Paris, Luxembourg was liberated from French rule, but its final status was to be determined at the Congress of Vienna the following year. There, it was agreed that Luxembourg would be elevated to a Grand Duchy, and that the House of Orange would receive all of the Low Countries, including Luxembourg. However, Prussia, which had received the whole of the Rhineland and Westphalia during the war, requested the fortress of Bitburg, which would serve to form part of the German Confederation's western border fortifications. As the rest of Luxembourg was changing hands anyway, the Dutch did not attempt to argue this point.

The Second Partition reduced Luxembourg's territory by 2,280 km^{2} (880 sq mi), or 24% of Luxembourg's contemporary area. Along with Bitburg, Prussia gained the towns of Neuerburg, Sankt Vith, Schleiden, and Waxweiler (previously the County of Schleiden, the Herrschaft Kronenburg, the County of Vianden and the Provosty of Bitburg). Altogether, the lands had a population of 50,000. Today, these lands belong to both Germany and Belgium; the district of Eupen-Malmedy was ceded by Germany to Belgium in 1919 under the Treaty of Versailles.

== Third Partition ==
The largest territorial loss occurred under the 1839 Treaty of London. At the outbreak of the Belgian Revolution, most Luxembourgers joined the Belgian rebels and took control of most of the Grand Duchy of Luxembourg; the only town that did not fall into Belgian hands was the capital, Luxembourg City, which was also the largest city and most important fortress. The London Conference of 1838–39, held prior to the signing of the treaty, considered a number of proposals which had evolved over the previous decade. The first proposal was that the whole of Luxembourg would remain in personal union with the Netherlands, but this was rejected by Belgium's King Leopold I. In July 1831, the Great Powers relented, and the Conference instead decreed that the status of Luxembourg would be decided later; the Netherlands, which had assented to the Conference's decision, invaded Belgium to force the Belgians to accept limitation of its territory. After the withdrawal of Dutch forces, the London Conference made its third suggestion, that Luxembourg be divided between the two countries, with most of the land going to Belgium, but with Luxembourg City remaining under Dutch control. Leopold agreed, and the treaty was signed on the 15 November 1831. Although the Dutch King William I rejected this suggestion at first, after the stand-off had dragged on for several years, he gave in, and agreed to the partition in 1839.

In the Third Partition, Luxembourg lost all of its western territories, including the towns of Arlon, Aubange, Bastogne, Durbuy, Marche-en-Famenne, Neufchâteau, and Virton. They (along with the Duchy of Bouillon) later formed the Belgian Luxembourg province, which is now a Walloon province, the largest in Belgium. The territory ceded to Belgium was 4,730 km^{2} (1,830 sq mi), or 65% of the territory of the Grand Duchy at the time. The population of this territory was 175,000: half of Luxembourg's total population. The German Confederation refused to sanction the loss of its legal rights in western Luxembourg without suitable compensation. The Conference assigned the Dutch portion of the Duchy of Limburg to the German Confederation that was equal in population to the territory lost to Belgium. The cities of Maastricht and Venlo were therefore excluded from the Confederation.

The line of Luxembourg's partition was established in London, on the basis of maps that were out-of-date and inaccurate. It used several criteria, with the linguistic criterion being the main one. The Grand Duchy lost all of its French-speaking territories. For military reasons and due to French pressure, the Arlon region, though German-speaking, was also given to Belgium. The objective was to remove the Athus-Arlon road from the influence of the German Confederation; in Arlon, it joined up with the road leading to Brussels.

The mixing-up of the applied criteria may explain the sometimes arbitrary nature of the line of demarcation. In many cases, it separated families as well as economic entities.

== See also ==
- Greater Region of SaarLorLux
- Luxembourg question

== References and further reading ==
- Calmes, Albert (24 April 1957). "La "Partie cédée"". Luxemburger Wort (in French). p. 14.
- Calmes, Albert (10 February 1960). "L'attribution du Kammerwald". Luxemburger Wort (in French). p. 13.
- Calmes, Christian (1989). The Making of a Nation From 1815 to the Present Day. Luxembourg City: Saint-Paul.
- Fyffe, Charles Alan (1895). A History of Modern Europe, 1792-1878 (Popular ed.).
- Trausch, Gilbert (1992). Histoire du Luxembourg (in French). Paris: Hatier. ISBN 2-218-03855-2.
