= De Meinweg National Park =

National park in Limburg, Netherlands

- Nationaal Park De Meinweg
- IUCN category II (national park)
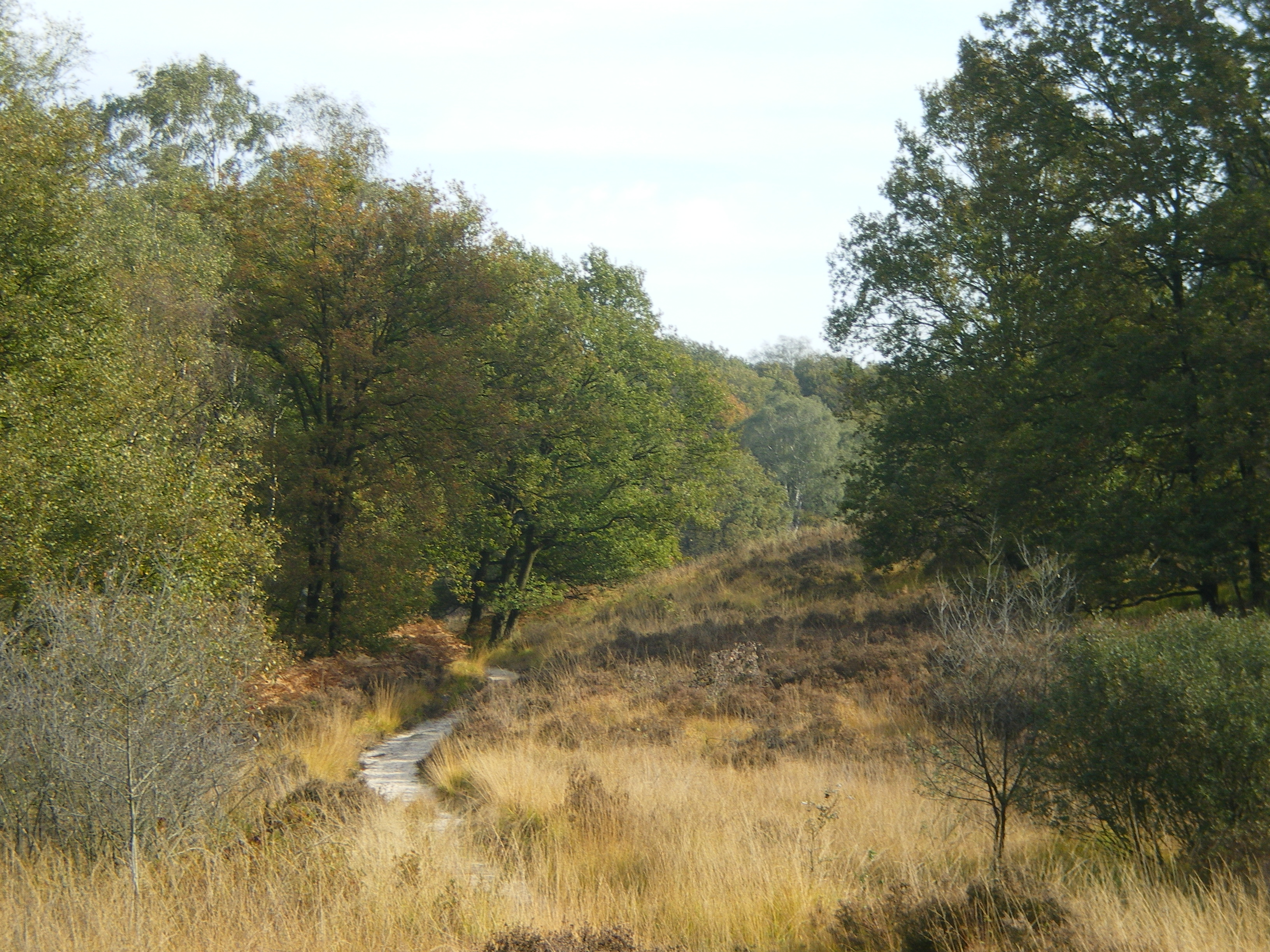
- Autumn in the national park De Meinweg, Netherlands

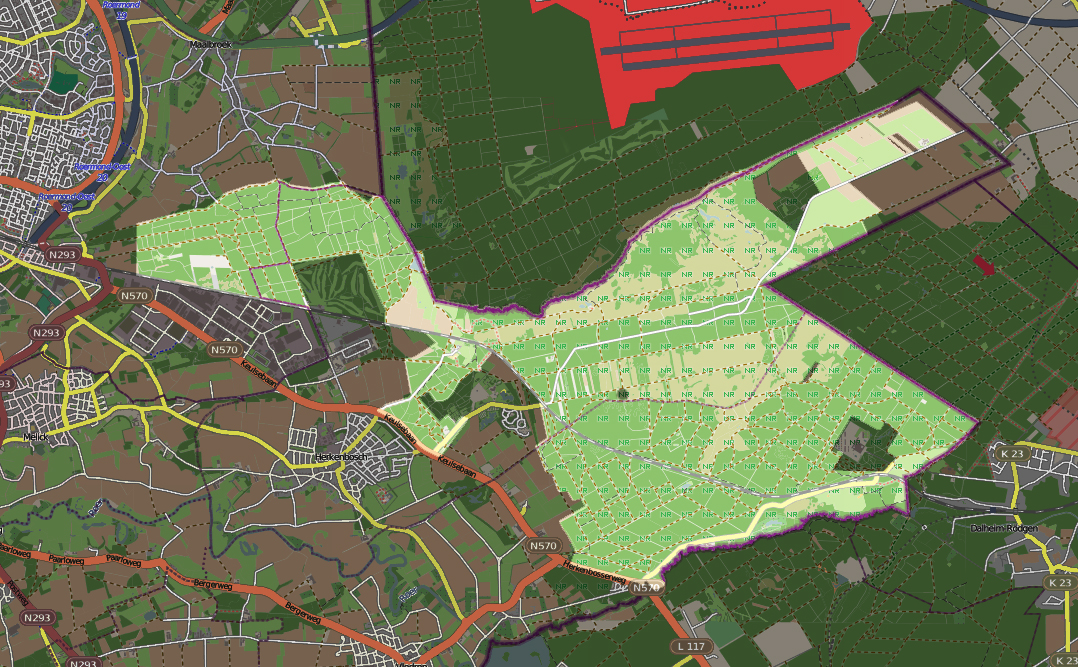
- Map of the National Park
- Location: Roerdalen, Limburg, Netherlands
- Coordinates: 51.16°N 6.12°E
- Area: 1,800 ha (6.9 sq mi)
- Established: 1995
- Governing body: Staatsbosbeheer

De Meinweg National Park (Nationaal Park De Meinweg) is a national park in Limburg, Netherlands. It is about 1800 hectares (7 sq. mi.) in size and was established in 1995.

In 2002 it became part of the Maas-Swalm-Nette park, a transboundary protected area on the German/Dutch border, covering 10,000 hectares (40 sq. mi.).
