= Gaspar Makale =

Tanzanian engineer

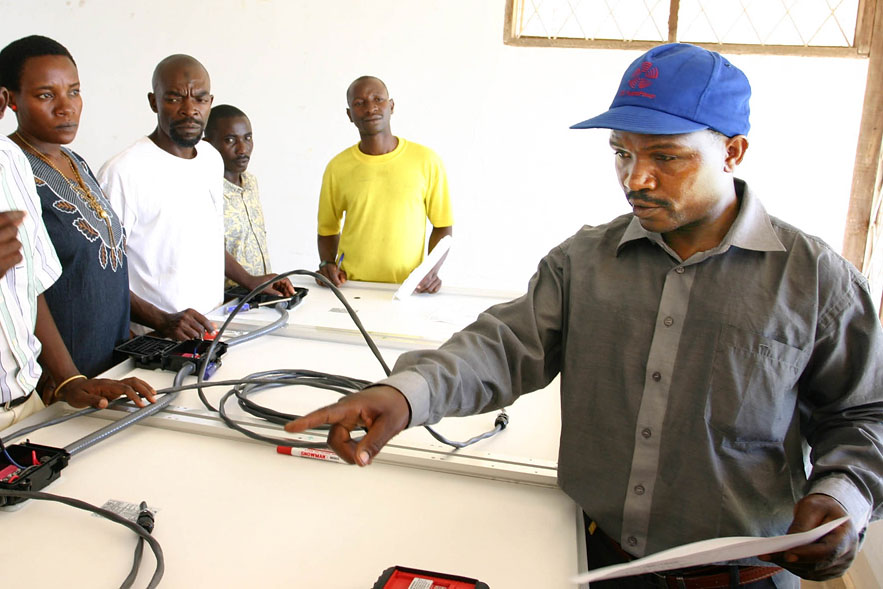
Makale (right, in hat) teaching a solar workshop in Kigoma, Tanzania, May 2005.

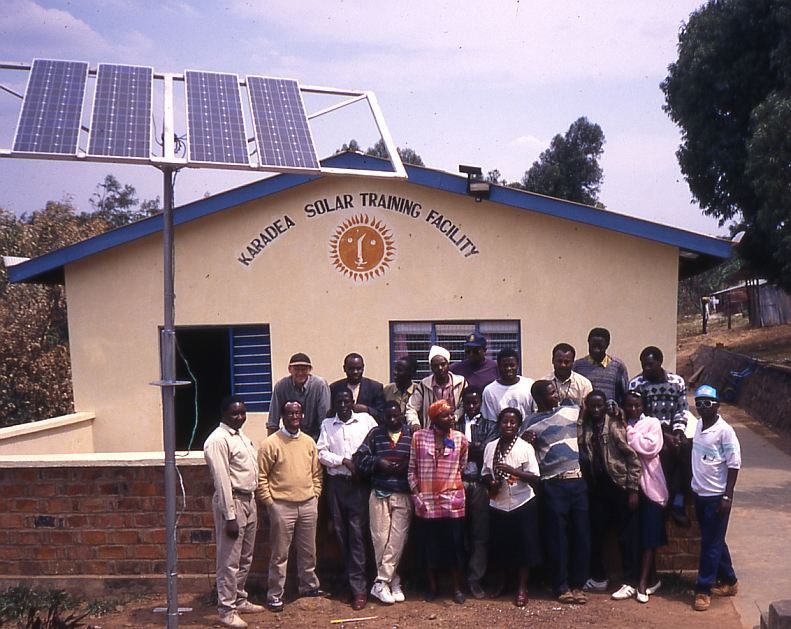
Solar training course at the KARADEA Solar Training Facility (KSTF), 1996, Makale (front row, first on right), Daniel Kithokoi (back row, first on right) Mark Hankins (back row, first on left)

Gaspar Makale (1960 circa. to December 2007, Tanzania) was one of the pioneers of solar electrification in the African Great Lakes. During the 1990s, he was the Chief Solar Technician at the KARADEA Solar Training Facility (KSTF) in Karagwe District, Kagera in Northern Tanzania, situated between Lake Victoria and Rwanda.

KSTF, the first dedicated training centre for solar energy technology in the African Great Lakes, was founded by Oswald Kasazi in 1993. During the following decade KSTF gave regular three-week-long training courses which were attended by people from all over the African Great Lakes region (Tanzania, Kenya, Uganda), as well as from further afield. The courses were held in partnership with Alternative Energy Africa (EAA), run by Mark Hankins and Daniel Kithokoi, who were based in Nairobi, Kenya. Makale managed the practical sessions as well as arranging for the field-trips during which course participants installed solar electric domestic systems in the Karagwe district.

KSTF also ran a solar apprentice scheme for which Makale was responsible. He was also involved in other solar training courses in Tanzania, such as the one held at Wasso Hospital, situated in Maasailand, Tanzania. Course participants, many of whom later went on to set up solar businesses and work in the growing African Great Lakes solar industry, got their first hands-on experience of installing solar electric systems under Makale's experienced and expert guidance. He installed an Ampair Hawk 100 wind turbine at KSTF for charging batteries, the first wind turbine installed in that part of Tanzania. He also ran his own solar business.

While working with KSTF, Makale installed numerous solar systems in local schools, hospitals, clinic refrigeration systems, two-way radio systems, domestic lighting systems. He also installed systems in the refugee camps that sprung up in Karagwe after the Rwanda genocide in 1994. He made one trip to the USA where he attended solar and wind energy courses at Solar Energy International in Colorado, USA. He also ran a solar-powered disco in his own village where he lived with his family on a small farm.

Makale also worked closely with Harold Burris of Solar Shamba, one of the first people to see the potential of solar electricity in the African Great Lakes, and with Frank Jackson from APSO (the Irish state overseas development agency), who worked at KSTF during the 1990s.

== See also ==
- Renewable energy in developing countries
- Agency for Non-conventional Energy and Rural Technology
- Ashden Awards for Sustainable Energy
- Energy for All
- International Renewable Energy Agency
- Renewable energy in Africa
- Renewable energy in China
- Solar for all
- Solar power in South Asia
- Solar powered refrigerator
- SolarAid
- UN-Energy
- Wind power in Asia
- Fabio Rosa
