= Energy poverty =

Lack of access to energy services such as electricity and heating

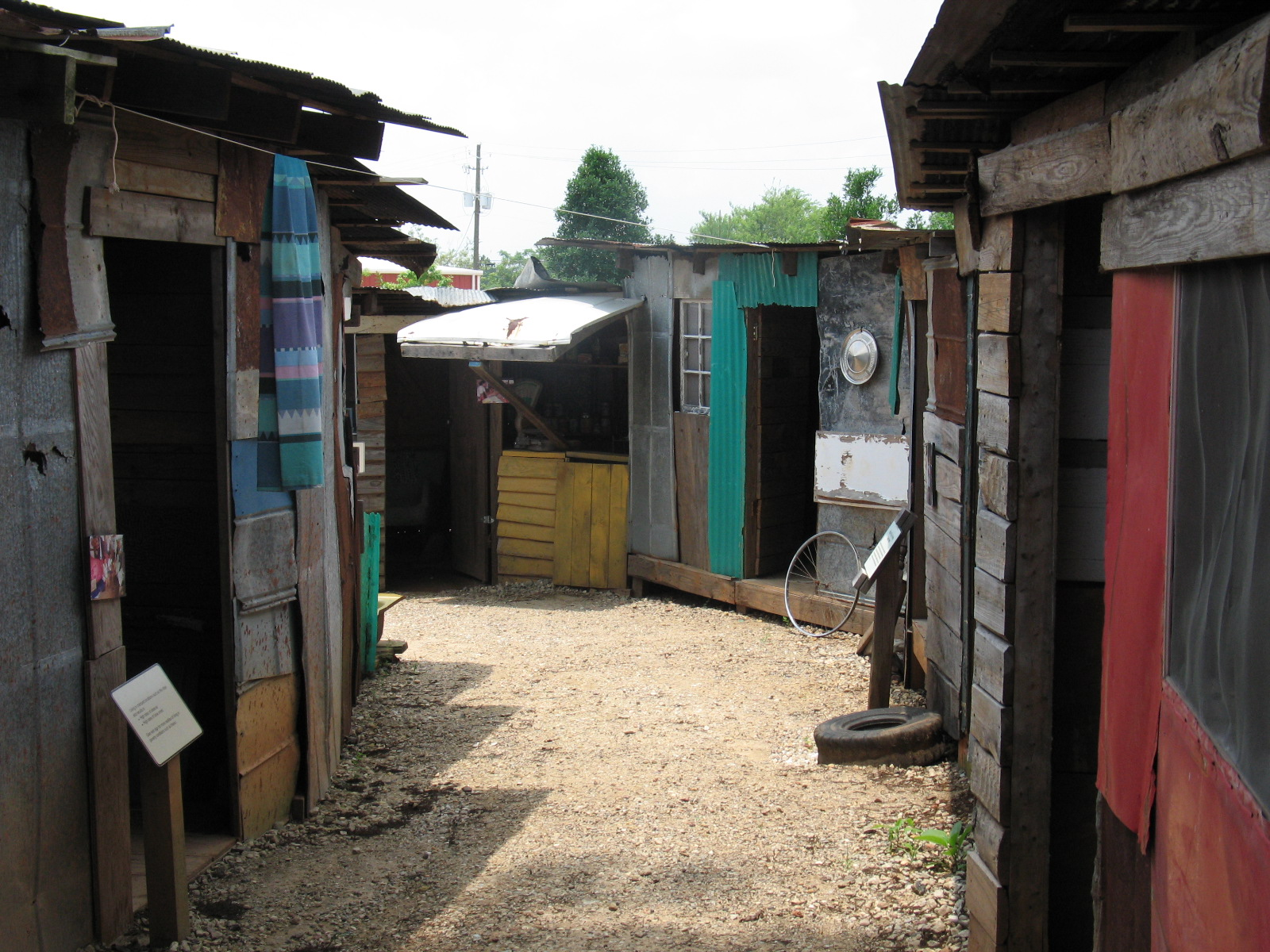
Homes without reliable access to energy such as electricity, heating, cooling, etc.

In developing countries and some areas of more developed countries, energy poverty is lack of access to modern energy services in the home. In 2024, an estimated 655 million people had no access to electricity and about two billion cooked with polluting fuels and technologies.

The main indices used to measure energy poverty are the Energy Development Index (EDI), the Multidimensional Energy Poverty Index (MEPI), and Energy Poverty Index (EPI). Researchers use both simple yes-or-no measures and measures that combine several factors. Energy poverty harms public and household health, education, and women's opportunities.

According to the Energy Poverty Action initiative of the World Economic Forum, "Access to energy is fundamental to improving quality of life and is a key imperative for economic development. In the developing world, energy poverty is still rife." As a result of this situation, the United Nations (UN) launched the Sustainable Energy for All Initiative and designated 2012 as the International Year for Sustainable Energy for All, which had a major focus on reducing energy poverty.

The term energy poverty is also sometimes used in the context of developed countries to mean an inability to afford energy in the home. This concept is also known as fuel poverty, household energy insecurity or energy hardship.

== Description ==
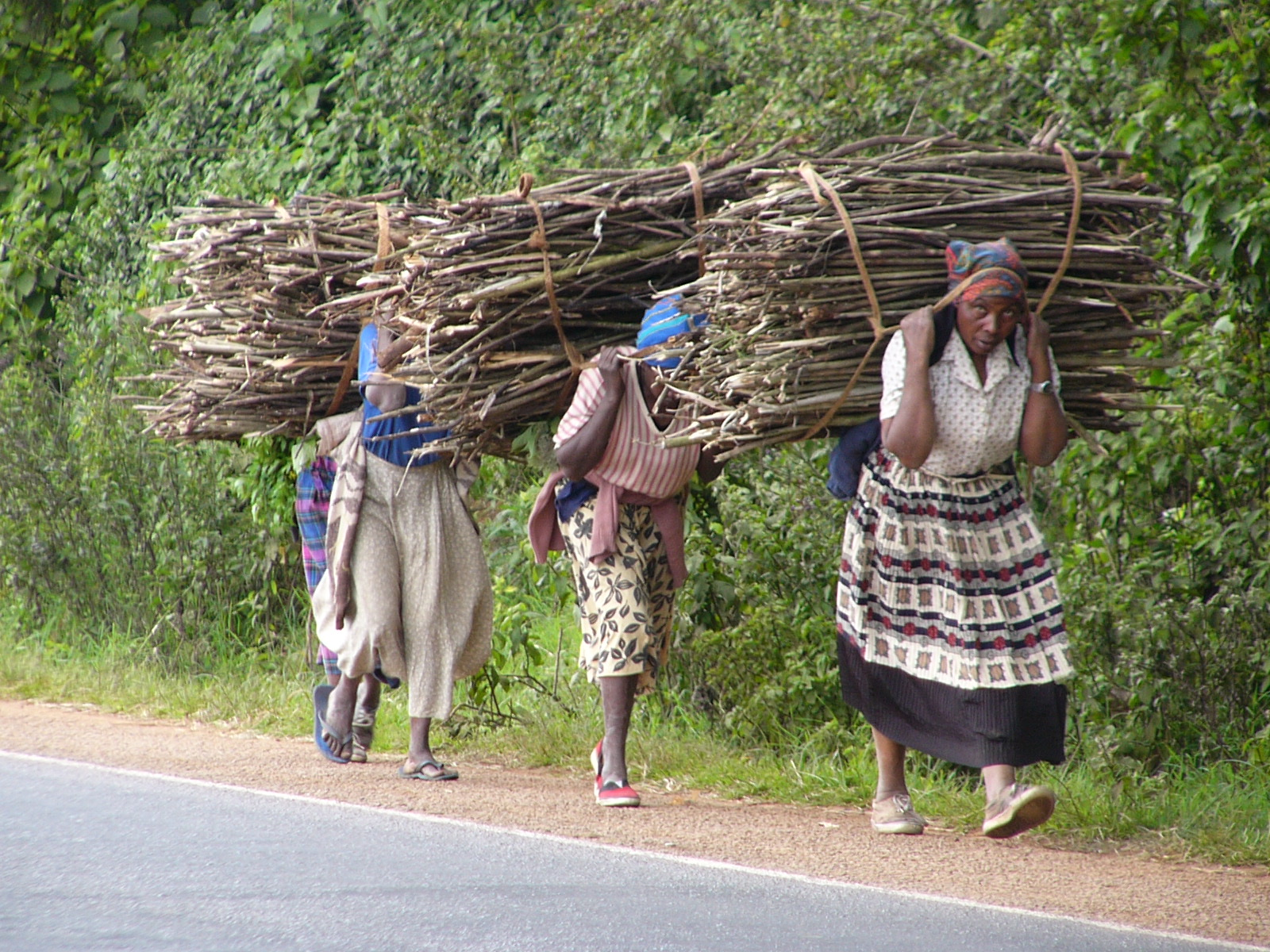
Women gathering firewood for fuel.

Many people in developing countries do not have modern energy infrastructure. They have heavily relied on traditional biomass such as wood fuel, charcoal, crop residue, and wood pellets. Although some developing countries like the BRICS have neared the energy-related technological level of developed countries and have financial power, most developing countries are still dominated by traditional biomass.

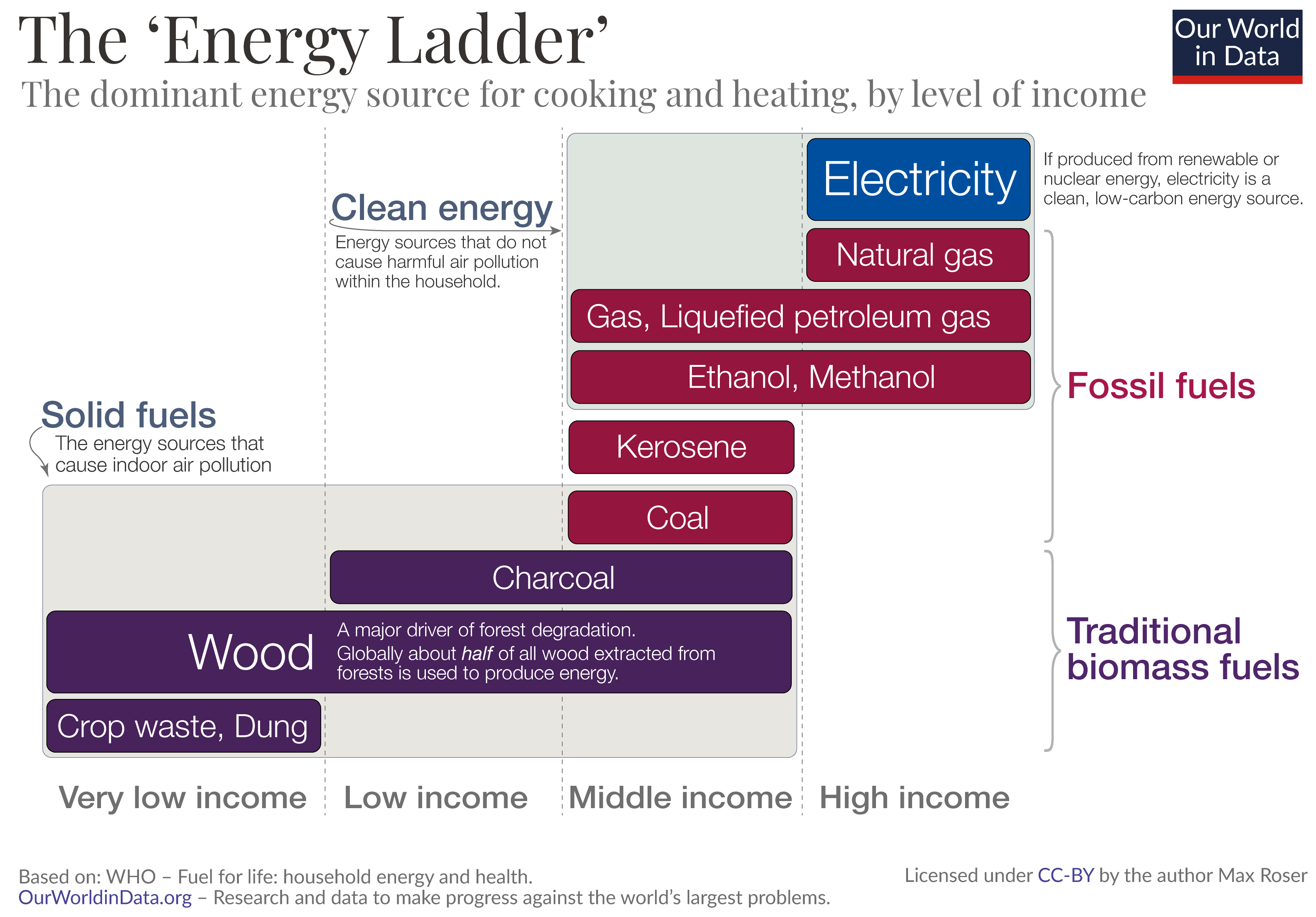
The 'Energy Ladder': What energy sources do people on different incomes rely on?

The "energy ladder" describes how household fuel use changes with income. Poorer households tend to use fuels that are cheap and locally available but dirty and inefficient, such as crop waste, dung, wood and coal. As incomes rise, households are expected to move to cleaner, more efficient and more expensive fuels, ending with electricity, although in practice this shift has been slow.

=== Causes ===
One cause of energy poverty is lack of modern energy infrastructure like power plants, transmission lines, and underground pipelines to deliver energy resources such as natural gas. When infrastructure does make modern energy available, its cost may be out of reach for poorer households, so they avoid using it.

== Definitions and measurement ==
=== Domestic energy poverty ===
Domestic energy poverty refers to a situation where a household does not have access or cannot afford to have the basic energy or energy services to achieve day to day living requirements. These requirements can change from country to country and region to region. The most common needs are lighting, cooking energy, domestic heating or cooling.

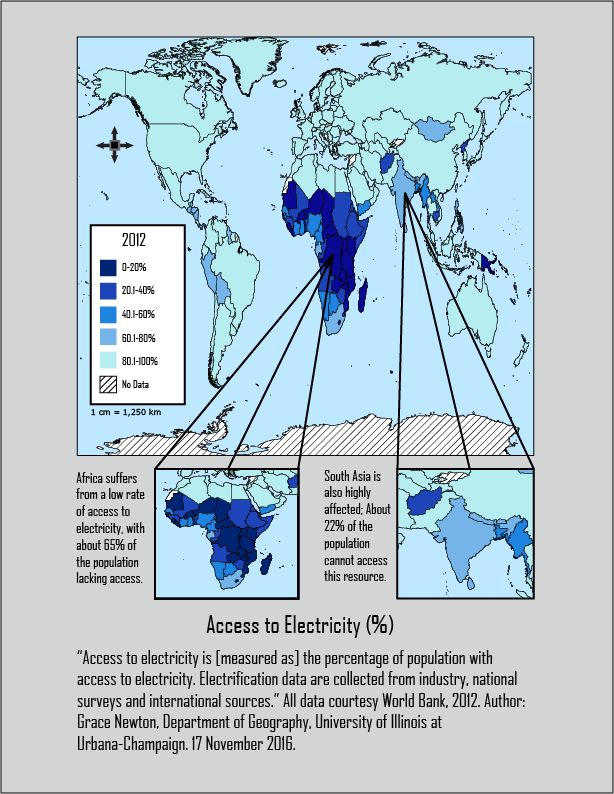
Lack of access to electricity is one indicator of energy poverty.

Other authors consider different categories of energy needs from "fundamental energy needs" associated to human survival and extremely poor situations. "Basic energy needs" required for attaining basic living standards, which includes all the functions in the previous (cooking, heating and lighting) and, in addition energy to provide basic services linked to health, education and communications. "Energy needs for productive uses" when additionally basic energy needs the user requires energy to make a living; and finally "Energy for recreation", when the user has fulfilled the previous categories and needs energy for enjoyment." Until recently energy poverty definitions took only the minimum energy quantity required into consideration when defining energy poverty, but a different school of thought is that not only energy quantity but the quality and cleanliness of the energy used should be taken into consideration when defining energy poverty.

One such definition reads as:

"A person is in 'energy poverty' if they do not have access to at least:
(a) the equivalent of 35 kg LPG for cooking per capita per year from liquid and/or gas fuels or from improved supply of solid fuel sources and improved (efficient and clean) cook stoves
and
(b) 120kWh electricity per capita per year for lighting, access to most basic services (drinking water, communication, improved health services, education improved services and others) plus some added value to local production

An 'improved energy source' for cooking is one which requires less than 4 hours person per week per household to collect fuel, meets the recommendations WHO for air quality (maximum concentration of CO of 30 mg/M3 for 24 hours periods and less than 10 mg/ M3 for periods 8 hours of exposure), and the overall conversion efficiency is higher than 25%. "

=== Double energy vulnerability and transport poverty ===
Some households lack both adequate energy at home and affordable transport, which researchers call double energy vulnerability.

=== Composite indices ===
==== Energy Development Index (EDI) ====
First introduced in 2004 by the International Energy Agency (IEA), the Energy Development Index (EDI) aims to measure a country's transition to modern fuels. It is calculated as the weighted average of four indicators: "1) Per capita commercial energy consumption as an indicator of the overall economic development of a country; 2) Per capita consumption of electricity in the residential sector as a metric of electricity reliability and customers׳ ability to financially access it; 3) Share of modern fuels in total residential energy sector consumption to indicate access to modern cooking fuels; 4) Share of population with access to electricity." (The EDI was modeled after the Human Development Index (HDI).) Because the EDI is calculated as the average of indicators which measure the quality and quantity of energy services at a national level, the EDI provides a metric that provides an understanding of the national level of energy development. At the same time, this means that the EDI is not well-equipped to describe energy poverty at a household level.

==== Multidimensional Energy Poverty Index (MEPI) ====
Measures whether an individual is energy poor or rich based on how intensely they experience energy deprivation. Energy deprivation is categorized by seven indicators: "access to light, modern cooking fuel, fresh air, refrigeration, recreation, communication, and space cooling." An individual is considered energy poor if they experience a predetermined number of energy deprivations. The MEPI is calculated by multiplying the ratio of people identified as energy poor to the total sample size and the average intensity of energy deprivation of the energy poor. Some strengths of the MEPI is that it takes into account the number of energy poor along with the intensity of their energy poverty. On the other hand, because it collects data at a household or individual level, it is harder to understand the broader national context.

==== Energy Poverty Index (EPI) ====
Developed by Mirza and Szirmai in their 2010 study to measure energy poverty in Pakistan, the Energy Poverty Index (EPI) is calculated by averaging the energy shortfall and energy inconvenience of a household. Energy inconvenience is measured through indicators such as: "Frequency of buying or collecting a source of energy; Distance from household traveled; Means of transport used; Household member's involvement in energy acquisition; Time spent on energy collection per week; Household health; Children's involvement in energy collection." Energy shortfall is measured as the lack of sufficient energy to meet basic household needs. This index weighs more heavily the impact of the usability of energy services rather than its access. Similar to the MEPI, the EPI collects data at a micro-level which lends to greater understanding of energy poverty at the household level.

=== Problems with measurement ===
Energy poverty is hard to define and measure because there is no agreed standard for what counts as a basic energy service, and no single indicator is accepted internationally. Researchers therefore use both simple yes-or-no measures, such as whether a household has electricity, and measures that combine several factors. Definitions differ even among countries in the European Union.

== Effects ==
Energy poverty damages household and public health and reduces the quality and amount of education children receive. Many of its effects fall more heavily on women.

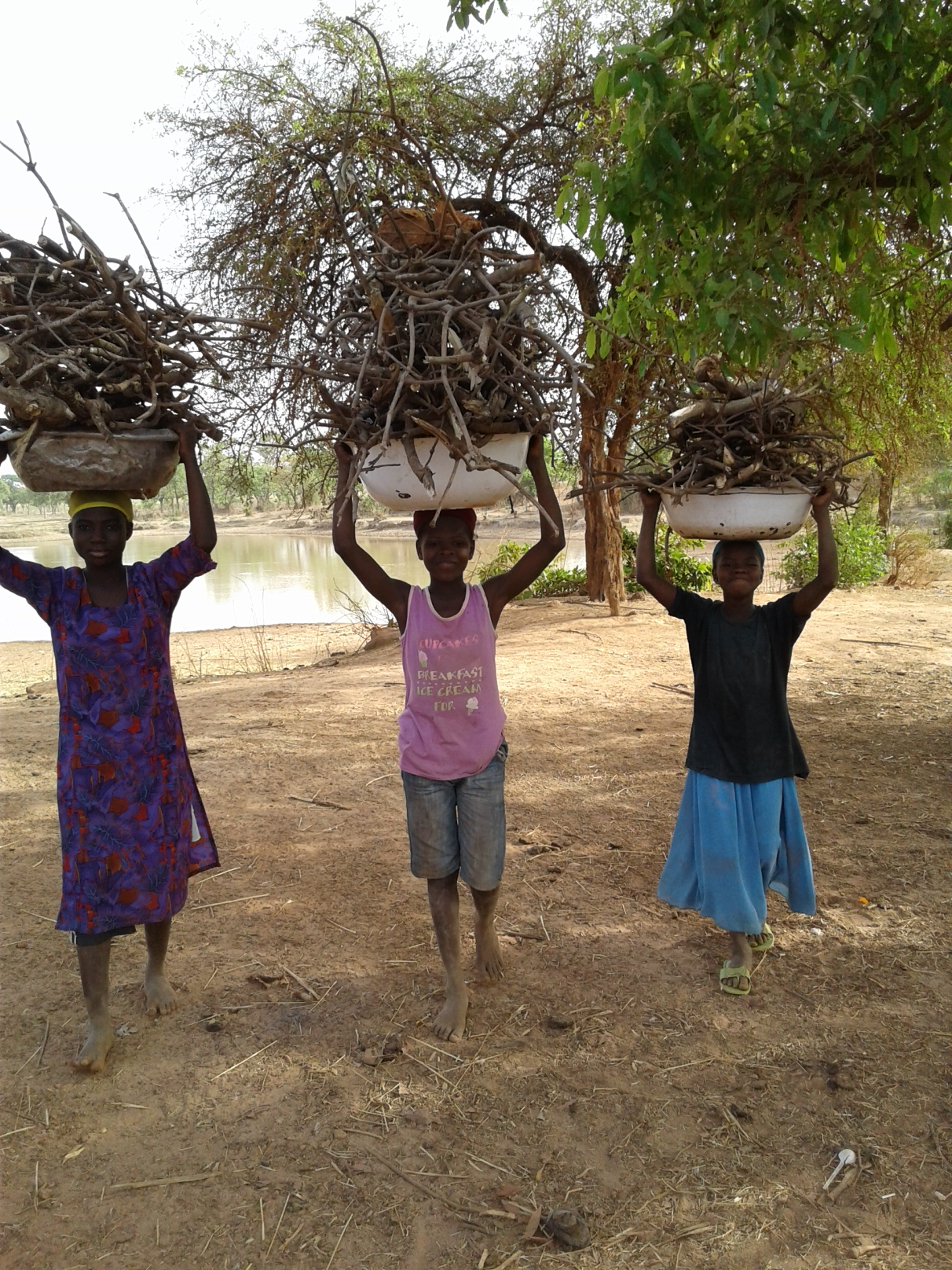
Children gathering firewood

=== Gender ===
In households that cook with wood, charcoal, dung or other polluting fuels, women and children do most of the cooking and fuel collection and so carry most of the health burden. The World Health Organization estimates that household air pollution caused about 2.9 million deaths in 2021, including more than 309,000 children under five. WHO survey data from 13 countries found that girls in sub-Saharan African homes using polluting cookstoves spend about 18 hours a week collecting fuel or water, compared with 15 hours for boys; in homes that mainly use cleaner stoves and fuels, the figures are 5 and 2 hours.

In developing countries, women and girls are usually responsible for supplying household energy. The time they spend collecting fuel such as wood, paraffin and dung leaves less for education, paid work and leisure. In developed countries, women are more likely to experience energy poverty because their incomes are lower on average relative to energy costs. For example, women-headed households made up 38% of the 5.6 million French households unable to heat their homes adequately. Older women are the most affected, because they have fewer financial resources and less ability to invest in energy-saving measures.

=== Education ===
Limited electricity access affects students' quality of education because it can limit the amount of time students can study by not having reliable energy access to study after sunset. Additionally, having consistent access to energy means that girls, who are usually responsible for collecting fuel for their household, have more time to focus on their studies and attend school.

Ninety percent of children in Sub-Saharan Africa go to primary schools that lack electricity. In Burundi and Guinea, only 2% of schools are electrified, while in DR Congo there is only 8% school electrification for a population of 75.5 million. In the DRC alone, by these statistics, there are almost 30 million children attending school without power.

Education is a key component in growing human capital which in turn facilitates economic growth by enabling people to be more productive workers in the economy. As developing nations accumulate more capital, they can invest in building modern energy services while households gain more options to pursue modern energy sources and alleviate energy poverty.

=== Health ===
Households who are energy poor are more likely to use traditional biomass such as wood and cow dung to fulfill their energy needs, which leads to incomplete combustion and releases black carbon into the atmosphere. Black carbon can be a health hazard. Research has found that people who live in energy poverty have an increased risk of respiratory diseases like influenza and asthma and even a positive correlation with higher mortality rates during winters. Moreover, research analyzing the inadequate heating systems in houses in the United Kingdom has found a correlation between this lack of access to proper heating services and an increased risk of mortality from cardiovascular diseases.

=== Development ===
Businesses, industry and public services such as healthcare, education and communications depend on energy. A lack of adequate energy services is associated with poverty indicators such as infant mortality, illiteracy and life expectancy, and can push people to move to cities in search of better living conditions. Energy consumption and economic growth have historically risen together, although it is unclear which causes the other. By the early 2000s developed countries had begun to grow their economies without a matching rise in energy use, but in developing countries the two remained closely linked.

=== Climate change ===
The effects of global warming, as a result of climate change, vary in their correlation to energy poverty. In countries with cold climates where energy poverty is primarily due to the lack of access to proper heating sources, average temperature increases from global warming result in warmer winters and decrease energy poverty rates. On the contrary, in countries with warm climates where energy poverty is primarily a result of inadequate access to cooling energy sources, warmer temperatures exacerbate energy poverty in these regions.

A 2024 study of the relationship between energy poverty and temperature extremes in Australia found that hardship increases in both extreme cold and extreme hot temperatures, and that climate change will not result in the elimination of energy hardship as extreme heat will drive energy needs.

== Solutions ==
One specific recommendation for reducing the negative effects of energy poverty on public health is the distribution and improvement to clean, efficient cook stoves among disadvantaged communities that suffer from the effects of lack of access to energy services. Proposed as an alternative for the improvement of public health and welfare, the distribution of cooking stoves could be an inexpensive and immediate approach to decreasing mortality rates within the sector of energy poverty. These cooking stoves would, however, need to be connected to an appropriate energy source. Distributing cleaner liquified petroleum gas (LPG) or electric stoves (in electrified areas) among developing countries would prevent the inadequate cooking and dangerous exposure to traditional biomass fuel.

== Regional analysis ==
Energy poverty takes different forms in different regions.

=== Global North ===
In the Global North, energy poverty is usually called fuel poverty and refers to households that cannot afford to heat, cool and power their homes. It is driven by high energy costs, low household incomes and inefficient appliances. Additionally, older people are more vulnerable to experiencing fuel poverty because of their income status and lack of access to energy-saving technologies. Other research, however, has found lower levels of energy poverty among older people. According to the European Fuel Poverty and Energy Efficiency (EPEE), approximately 50-125 million people live in fuel poverty. Like energy poverty, fuel poverty is hard to define and measure because of its many nuances. The United Kingdom (UK) and Ireland, are one of the few countries which have defined fuel poverty to be if 10% of a household's income is spent on heating/cooling. Another EPEE project found that 1 in 7 households in Europe were on the margins of fuel poverty by using three indicators of checking for leaky roofs, arrears on utility bills, ability to pay for adequate heating, mold in windows. High energy prices, insufficient insulation in dwellings, and low incomes contribute to increased vulnerability to fuel poverty. Climate change adds more pressure as weather events become colder and hotter, thereby increasing demand for fuel to cool and heat the home. The ability to provide adequate heating during cold weather has implications for people's health as cold weather can be an antagonistic factor to cardiovascular and respiratory illness.

Brenda Boardman's book, Fuel Poverty: From Cold Homes to Affordable Warmth (1991) motivated the need to develop public policy to address energy poverty and also study its causes, symptoms, and effects in society. When energy poverty was first introduced in Boardman's book, energy poverty was described as not having enough power to heat and cool homes. Energy poverty is hard to measure because it happens inside private homes and varies between cultures and over time.

=== Global South ===
Energy poverty in the Global South is largely driven by a lack of access to modern energy sources because of poor energy infrastructure, weak energy service markets, and insufficient household incomes to afford energy services. However, recent research suggests that alleviating energy poverty requires more than building better power grids because political, economic and cultural factors also affect a region's ability to transition to modern energy sources.

Energy access is linked to many of the Sustainable Development Goals. For example: greater access to clean energy for cooking improves the health of women by reducing the indoor air pollution associated with burning traditional biomasses for cooking; farmers can find better prices for their crops using telecommunication networks; people have more time to pursue leisure and other activities which can increase household income from the time saved from looking for firewood and other traditional biomasses, etc.

==== Africa ====
Sub-Saharan Africa, Latin America, and South Asia are the three regions in the world most affected by energy poverty. Africa's unique challenge with energy poverty is its rapid urbanization and booming urban centers. On average, only 25% of people who reside in urban areas in Africa have electricity access. Study findings have informed policy makers in African countries on state intervention methods to increase household energy access and reduce the gap in educational opportunities between rural and urban areas. Historical trends show that Africa's rapid population growth has not been proportionally matched by increased access to electricity. The rise of poverty in urban centers in addition to the growing population and energy demand is driving up the cost of electricity, making energy even more inaccessible for Africa's poorest people.

A study involving data from 33 African countries from 2010-2017 demonstrates a strong correlation between energy poverty, infant mortality, and inequality in education. Infant mortality for children under 5 in Africa is a prevalent consequence of energy poverty. The spread of waterborne diseases, smoke emissions, and low fuel quality continues to affect infant mortality and negatively impact educational performance among children in the region. About 970 million people in Sub-Saharan Africa lack access to clean cooking, out of roughly two billion worldwide. On average, girls receive less education than boys in the rural areas of the region affected by the lack of clean energy sources. A 2020 review argued that decentralized energy sources are needed to reduce energy poverty in rural Africa.

In many African households, women are responsible for fetching the coal and firewood the household needs, so they bear more of the consequences of energy poverty. The same review recommended sharing these tasks more evenly between men and women and making modern, clean energy more accessible and affordable.

==== South Asia ====
Energy poverty in South Asia encompasses more than just unreliable, unaffordable access to energy; it also includes the broader dimensions of the growing demand for electricity, access to energy, energy dependence, environmental threats to the energy system, and global pressures to decarbonize. Energy demand in South Asia has grown at an average annual rate of five percent in the past two decades, and this demand is projected to double by 2050. The demand for electricity in particular has been driven by the increasing population and the development of industry throughout the region. Although a push for energy efficiency has substantially reduced electricity demand due to economic growth, the electricity system in the region is still struggling to meet the needs of the growing population and economy.

In 2020, 95.8 percent of the total population in South Asia, and 99.7 percent of the urban population, had access to electricity, making it the second-largest region in the world with an electricity access deficit. However, in India only ten percent of homes in a village must be connected to the electricity grid in order for that entire village to be considered electrified. Other complications that lead to energy poverty include: flaws in the energy system that result in power losses, load shedding practices that shut down the grid during peak periods, and power that is stolen through informal electricity lines.

The reliability of the electricity system can also be hindered by the source of the electricity generated. In 2014, South Asia imported one-third of the total energy consumed in the region. Due to this energy dependence on imported fuel, energy resource scarcity and fluctuations in global price can result in higher costs for electricity in South Asia and can therefore make electricity services less accessible for the poorest people. The issue of energy poverty is compounded when climate change is factored into the equation. South Asian cities like Delhi in India are bearing the social and fiscal costs of this demand-supply gap, resulting in a power crisis.

==== Latin America ====
The United Nations Development Programme (UNDP) and the Inter-American Development Bank have provided reports and reviews of programs and policies designed to address energy poverty within Latin America and the Caribbean (LAC). Although studies show 96 percent of inhabitants of the LAC have access to electricity, gaps in energy poverty are still prevalent. More than 80 million people in the region still cook with fuels such as charcoal, which exposes them to respiratory illness.

Governments at the 2012 Summit of the Americas in Cartagena set a goal of universal electricity access by 2022, under an initiative called Connecting the Americas 2022. Some 30 million people in Latin America, or 5% of the population, lack access to electricity.

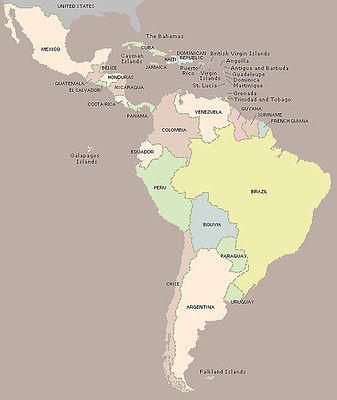
Map of Latin American countries

According to the United Nations, urban energy poverty in Latin America has nearly doubled in the last two decades. Growing rates of urbanization and industrialization in Buenos Aires, Argentina, Rio de Janeiro, Brazil, and Caracas, Venezuela have exacerbated the regions' high energy losses and increased inefficient energy use. The widespread increase in energy across Latin America does not have a uniform solution. In fact, different efforts and legislation to increase energy accessibility have had opposing effects in different Latin American countries. In Venezuela, for instance, public attitude supports the free supply of energy across the nation while in Brazil, the public is willing to pay as long as the government passes reforms for the affordability of energy services. Although there has been a recent increase in studies related to energy poverty in Latin America, there have not been many studies and data in the past on the prevalence of energy poverty in many Latin American countries with different climatic areas. For instance, studies in Mexico in 2022 determined that 66 percent of households suffered from energy poverty, with 38 percent of the cases being due to accessibility, and 34 percent due to affordability.

== International efforts ==
A 2021 briefing by Sustainable Energy for All said the COVID-19 pandemic had pushed more than 150 million people into poverty and argued that housing, economic, social and environmental policies were needed to make energy access more resilient.

=== European Union ===
There is an increasing focus on energy poverty in the European Union, where in 2013 its European Economic and Social Committee formed an official opinion on the matter recommending Europe focus on energy poverty indicators, analysis of energy poverty, considering an energy solidarity fund, analyzing member states' energy policy in economic terms, and a consumer energy information campaign. In 2016, it was reported how several million people in Spain live in conditions of energy poverty. Deaths linked to these conditions led to public anger at electricity suppliers' pricing. In 2017, poor households of Cyprus were found to live in low indoor thermal quality, i.e. their average indoor air temperatures were outside the accepted limits of the comfort zone for the island, and their heating energy consumption was found to be lower than the country's average for the clusters characterized by high and partial deprivation. This is because low income households cannot afford to use the required energy to achieve and maintain the indoor thermal requirements.

== See also ==
- Agency for Non-conventional Energy and Rural Technology
- Ashden Awards for Sustainable Energy
- Climate change mitigation
- Energy conservation
- Energy for All
- Energy poverty and gender
- Fuel poverty
- International Renewable Energy Agency
- Renewable energy in Africa
- Renewable energy in China
- Renewable energy in developing countries
- Solar cooker
- Solar power in South Asia
- Solar powered refrigerator
- SolarAid
- Sustainable Energy for All
- UN-Energy
- Wind power in Asia
