= Fábio Rosa =

Brazilian social entrepreneur (born 1960)

Fábio Luiz de Oliveira Rosa (Porto Alegre, 1960) is a Brazilian social entrepreneur whose initiatives have focused on rural electrification and the use of renewable energy sources.

== Biography ==
Rosa attended the Federal University of Rio Grande do Sul in Porto Alegre, where he graduated with a degree in agronomic engineering. In 1982, after leaving school, Rosa was invited by a classmate to visit the Palmares do Sul area of the southern Brazilian state, Rio Grande do Sul. Unbeknownst to Rosa at the time, his colleague's father, Ney Azevedo, was the current mayor of Palmares and in speaking with Rosa during this visit, Azevedo was so impressed that he offered him the position of secretary of agriculture.

=== Rural electrification in Palmares do Sul ===
Seeking ways to improve life in the region, Rosa interviewed residents who noted the ongoing economic pressure driving rural flight from Palmares. Rosa saw that high water costs were a significant impediment for local rice farmers and that lowering these costs could improve productivity and wealth. To address the high water costs, Rosa suggested expanding rural electrification to allow more farmers to drop their own wells for irrigation rather than paying exorbitant fees for water rights held by others.

At the time, 70 percent of rural residents in Palmares were without electricity. Rosa favored expanding access to electricity through an inexpensive mono-phase electrification system developed by Professor Ennio Amaral of the local Federal Technical School of Pelotas. The use of mono-phase technology reduced the costs for distributing electricity to each of these rural households from $7,000 to $400.

Using this system, Rosa instituted a successful pilot project that took place between 1984 and 1988. In 1988, a new mayor of Palmares was elected, who ended the program.

=== Pro Luz ===
In 1989, Rosa was named a fellow by Ashoka: Innovators for the Public and using the organization's stipend, he continued his efforts to expand rural electrification. In 1990, along with colleague Ricardo de Souza Mello, Rosa began work on Pro Luz (Project Light) to expand the Palmares model throughout Brazil. The program proved successful and the Brazilian government was receptive, even offering a dedicated line of credit for rural electrification programs. However, in 1992, Brazilian economic troubles led the government to reduce social spending on these types of projects. The repeated difficulties Rosa faced working through government led him to focus future efforts through private organizations.

=== S.T.A. ===
In 1992, Rosa established Sistemas de Tecnologia Agroelectro (STA) to popularize solar energy. He recognized that the critical barrier to the adoption of solar energy was its high cost. Thus, he worked to make it attractive by pairing it with electric fencing, which could help address Brazil's problems with overgrazing. Within several years STA had installed 700 solar powered fencing systems and Rosa "had gained national recognition as a leader in the delivery of low-cost solar energy".

=== 21st century ===
Rosa left STA in 2001 to expand his work with a non-profit he established called the Instituto Para O Desenvolvimento De Energias Alternativas E Da Auto Sustentabilidade (IDEAAS). IDEAAS was designed to take the basic STA framework and apply it as a nonprofit model in lower income areas.

Through market research and consultation with various experts, Rosa designed two enterprises using solar technology that could work through STA and IDEAAS, respectively: The Sun Shines for All and The Quiron Project. The Sun Shines for All is a for-profit solar energy venture administered through STA that leases comprehensive electrification packages including solar kits and outlets to those without access to the grid. The Quiron Project is a non-profit run through IDEEAS that is designed to improve the well-being of the rural poor in an environmentally responsible manner through solar electrification, improved agricultural management, and conservation.

== See also ==
- Renewable energy in developing countries
- Agency for Non-conventional Energy and Rural Technology
- Ashden Awards for Sustainable Energy
- Energy for All
- International Renewable Energy Agency
- Solar powered refrigerator
- SolarAid
- UN-Energy
- Gaspar Makale

== Sources ==
- "Fabio Rosa". 2004. The Schwab Foundation for Social Entrepreneurship. Retrieved on 5 December 2008.
- Bornstein, David. How to Change the World: Social Entrepreneurs and the Power of New Ideas. New York: Oxford University Press, 2007. ISBN 978-0-19-533476-0.
- Bornstein, David. 2003. "Fabio Rosa: Making the Sun Shine for All". Changemakers.net. Retrieved on 5 December 2008.
- "Fábio Luiz de Oliveira Rosa". 1989. Ashoka. Retrieved on 5 December 2008.
- Mugica, Yerina. 2004. "Distributed Solar Energy in Brazil: Fabio Rosa’s Approach to Social Entrepreneurship". University of North Carolina, Kenan-Flagler Business School. Retrieved on 5 December 2008.
