= Makale =

Makale can refer to:

- Makale, Indonesia, a town in Sulawesi, Indonesia
- Mek'ele, a town in Ethiopia
- Gaspar Makale, Tanzanian solar electricity pioneer
