= Renewable energy in developing countries =

Overview of the use of renewable energy in several developing countries

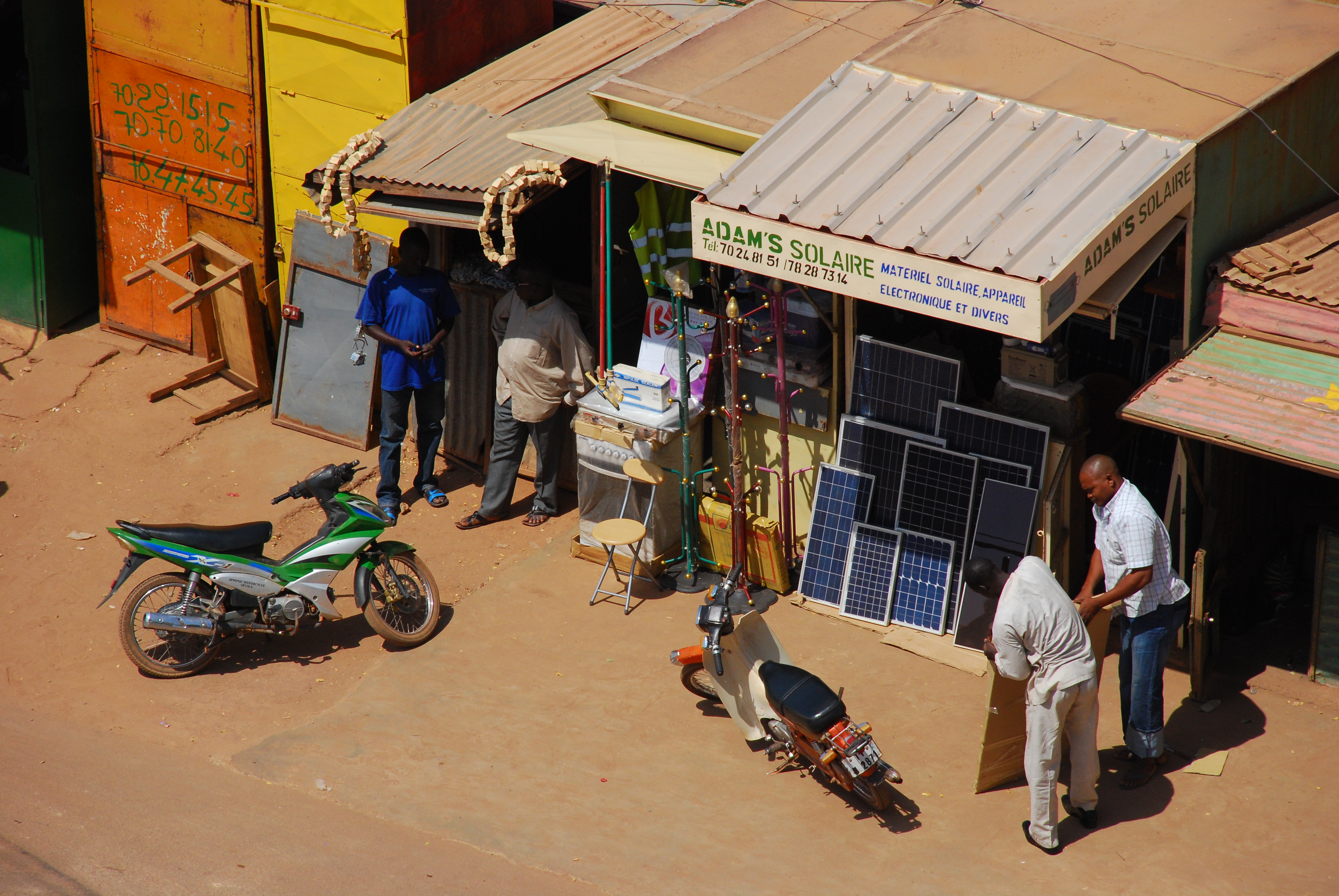
Shop selling PV panels in Ouagadougou, Burkina Faso

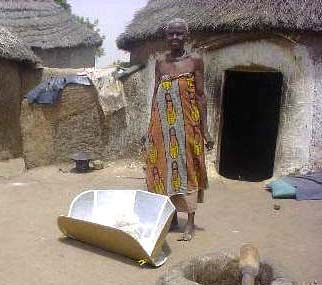
Solar cookers use sunlight as energy source for outdoor cooking.

Renewable energy in developing countries is an increasingly used alternative to fossil fuel energy, as these countries scale up their energy supplies and address energy poverty. Renewable energy technology was once seen as unaffordable for developing countries. However, since 2015, investment in non-hydro renewable energy has been higher in developing countries than in developed countries, and comprised 54% of global renewable energy investment in 2019. The International Energy Agency forecasts that renewable energy will provide the majority of energy supply growth through 2030 in Africa and Central and South America, and 42% of supply growth in China.

Most developing countries have abundant renewable energy resources, including solar energy, wind power, geothermal energy, and biomass, as well as the ability to manufacture the relatively labor-intensive systems that harness these. By developing such energy sources developing countries can reduce their dependence on oil and natural gas, creating energy portfolios that are less vulnerable to price rises. In many circumstances, these investments can be less expensive than fossil fuel energy systems.

In isolated rural areas, electricity grid extensions are often not economical. Off‐grid renewable technologies provide a sustainable and cost‐effective alternative to the diesel generators that would be otherwise be deployed in such areas. Renewable technologies can also help to displace other unsustainable energy sources such as kerosene lamps and traditional biomass.

Kenya is the world leader in the number of solar power systems installed per capita (but not the number of watts added). More than 30,000 small solar panels, each producing 12 to 30 watts, are sold in Kenya annually. Kenya was the first African country to use geothermal power, and still has the largest installed capacity of geothermal power in Africa at 200 MW, with a potential of up to 10 GW.

== Rationale for renewable energy ==
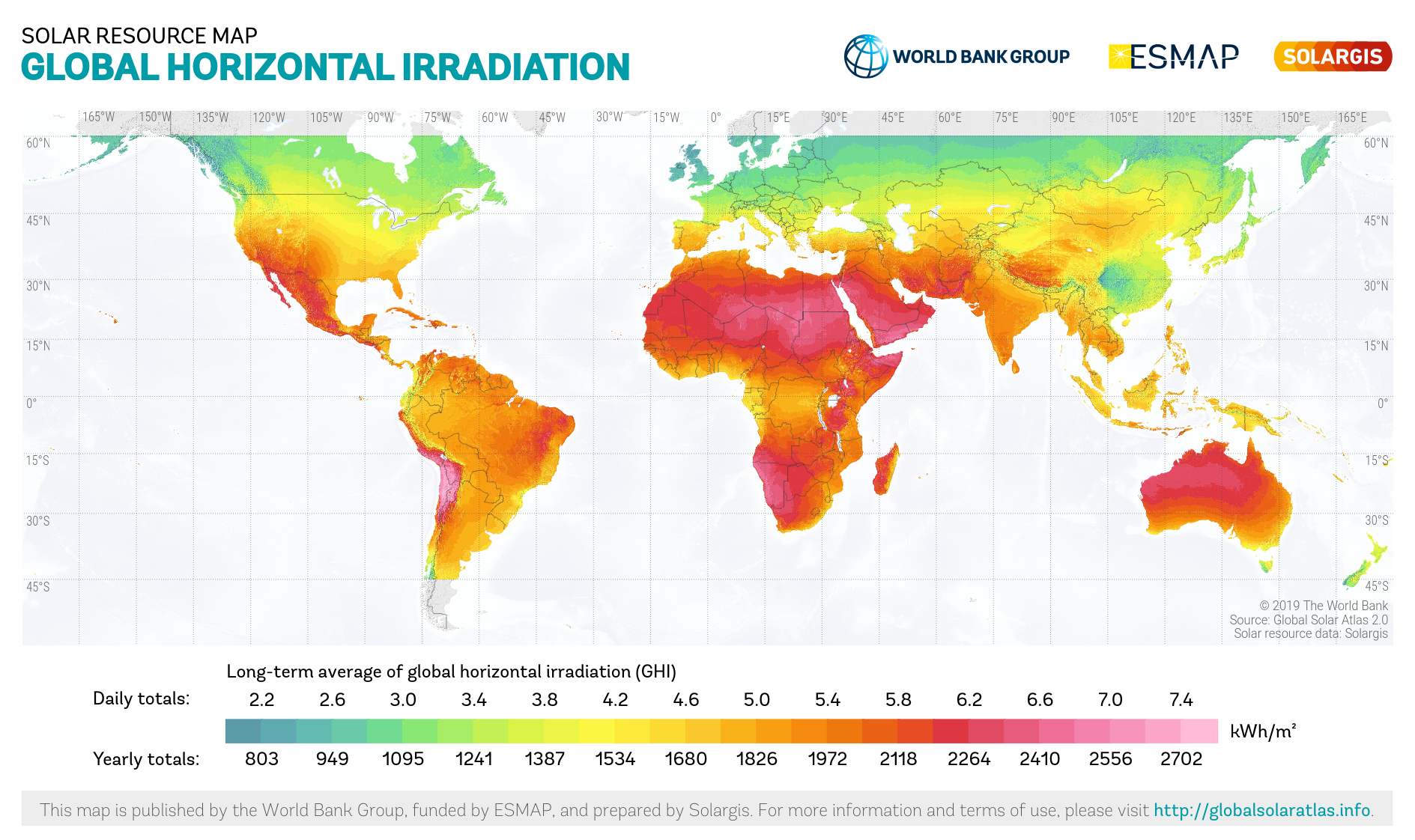
Global Map of Global Horizontal Irradiation.

In 2009, about 1.4 billion people in the world lived without electricity, and 2.7 billion relied on wood, charcoal, and dung for home energy requirements. This lack of access to modern energy technology limits income generation, blunts efforts to escape poverty, affects people's health, and contributes to global deforestation and climate change. Small-scale renewable energy technologies and distributed energy options, such as onsite solar power and improved cookstoves, offer rural households modern energy services.

Renewable energy can be particularly suitable for developing countries. In rural and remote areas, transmission and distribution of energy generated from fossil fuels can be difficult and expensive. Producing renewable energy locally can offer a viable alternative.

Renewable energy doesn't always have to come from a developing country. The Developing Areas Study Group session is a group of speakers from all over the energy businesses discusses the potential ideas to get developing countries the renewable energy that they need. Papers written by W. Morgan, R. Moss and P. Richard discuss the opportunities of renewable resources that lie within the developing country as well. Morgan and Richard claim firewood and agriculture could play a great role in an alternative energy solution in developing countries, while Richards claims that efficient use of agriculture could lead to renewable energy. Morgan also points out that green plants could play a great role in producing synthetic fuel alcohol, which would not only impact the developing country but the world as a whole in providing an alternative fuel source.

Interest in renewable energies has increased in recent years due to environmental concern about global warming and air pollution, reduced costs of the technologies themselves, and improved efficiency and reliability. In recent years, supportive programs from governments, businesses, nonprofit organizations, and community cooperatives have expanded access to these off-grid technologies and the energy services they provide. Program planners should select "low-hanging fruit" first, aiming for maximum access to modern energy services with the least effort.

== Use of renewables ==
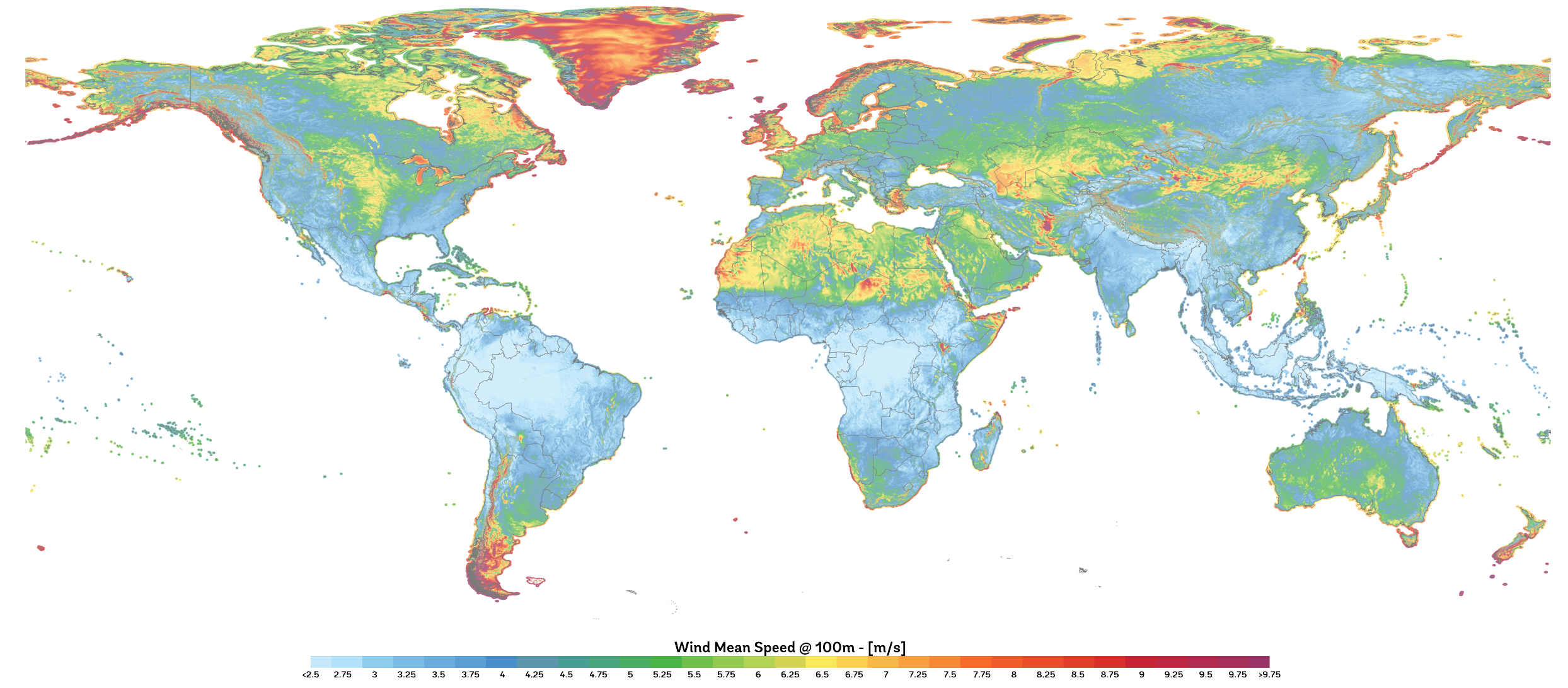
Global Map of Mean Wind Speed.

Collectively, developing countries have more than half of global renewable power capacity. China and India are rapidly expanding markets for renewable energy. Brazil produces most of the world's sugar-derived ethanol and has been adding new biomass and wind power plants. Many renewable markets are growing at rapid rates in countries such as Argentina, Costa Rica, Egypt, Indonesia, Kenya, Tanzania, Thailand, Tunisia, and Uruguay.

In isolated rural areas, electricity grid extensions are often not economical. Off‐grid renewable technologies provide a sustainable and cost‐effective alternative to the diesel generators that would be otherwise be deployed in such areas. Renewable technologies can also help to displace other unsustainable energy sources such as kerosene lamps and traditional biomass.

Technology advances are opening up a new solar power market for the approximately 1.3 billion people around the world who don't have access to grid electricity. The majority of this population uses kerosene lamps and solar power costs half as much as lighting with kerosene. An estimated 3 million households get power from small solar PV systems. Kenya is the world leader in the number of solar power systems installed per capita. More than 30,000 very small solar panels, each producing 12 to 30 watts, are sold in Kenya annually.

Micro-hydro systems configured into village-scale or county-scale mini-grids serve many areas. More than 30 million rural households get lighting and cooking from biogas made in household-scale systems. These stoves are being manufactured in factories and workshops worldwide, and more than 160 million households now use them.

=== Poverty alleviation ===
Renewable energy projects in many developing countries have demonstrated that renewable energy can directly contribute to poverty alleviation by providing the energy needed for creating businesses and employment. Renewable energy technologies can also make indirect contributions to alleviating poverty by providing energy for cooking, space heating, and lighting.

=== Education ===
Renewable energy can also contribute to education, by providing electricity to schools. Renewable energy for cooking and heating can reduce the time that children spend out of school collecting fuel. There is a high demand for clean energy workforce in Africa, however, many universities in the region still produce more workforce for fossil fuels than for renewable energy industries and thus the supply of human capital is lagging greatly behind demand in solar and wind energy sectors.

=== Health ===
2.4 billion people use only traditional biomass, such as wood, residues and dung, for cooking and heating. The constant use of these types of energy sources exposes them to indoor particulate and carbon monoxide concentrations many times higher than World Health Organization (WHO) standards. "Traditional stoves using dung and charcoal emit large amounts of carbon monoxide and other noxious gases. Women and children suffer most, because they are exposed for the longest periods of time. Acute respiratory illnesses affect as much as 6% of the world population. The WHO estimates that 2.5 million women and young children in developing countries die prematurely each year from breathing the fumes from indoor biomass stoves".

Renewable energy can improve this situation by reducing exposure to indoor pollutants. Furthermore, renewable can also provide energy to refrigerate medicine and sterilize medical equipment in rural areas where the access to electricity is difficult. It can also provide power to supply the fresh water and sewerage services needed to reduce the spread of infectious diseases.

== Government policies ==
More developing countries are implementing the public policies needed for the widespread development of renewable energy technologies and markets, which have traditionally been dominated by Europe, Japan, and North America. The exceptions include countries like Brazil, which has built the world's leading biofuels industry, China, India, which are leaders in developing decentralized renewable sources such as small hydro, small wind, biogas, and solar water heating. However, policies like feed-in tariff are applied. Besides, with the Kyoto Protocol, the program called the Clean Development Mechanism (CDM) that allows for industrialized nations to invest in projects that reduce emissions in developing countries as an alternative to more expensive emission reductions in their own countries.

Developing-country Governments need to steer resources mobilized for large-scale investments into new production sectors and new technologies. Some argue that policies should base on active industrial policies, combining large scale investments and active policy interventions. There is a need of subsidizing these types of energy services to make them affordable to the major part of the population.

=== Asia ===
==== Philippines ====
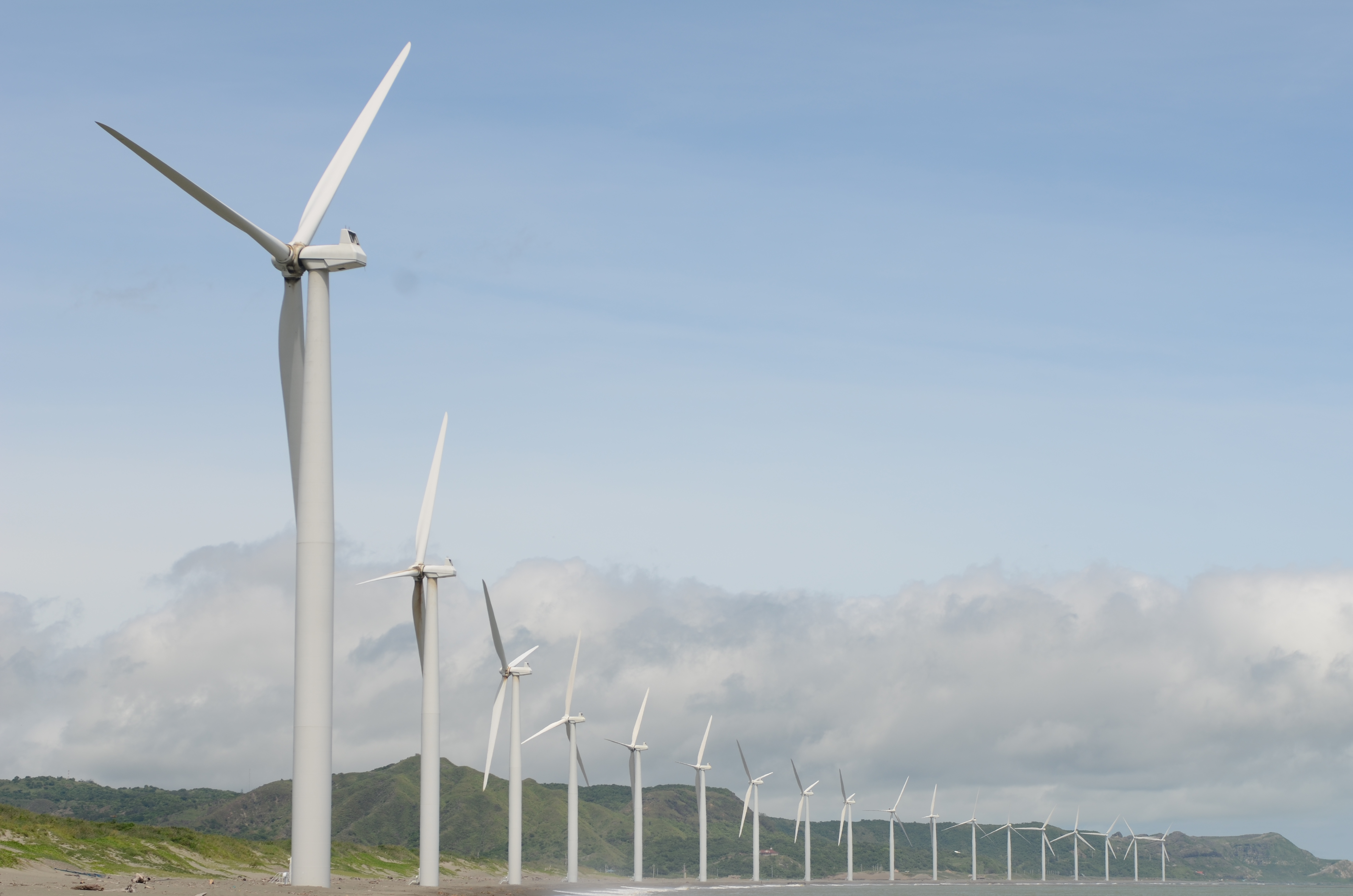
Bangui Wind Farm in Ilocos Norte, Philippines

The Philippine government sees the growth of the renewable energy sector essential for national energy security. The Philippines' fossil fuel sector is unsustainable, being dependent on the import of nonrenewable fuel, including petroleum, but has significant potential in the renewable energy sector. Based on a report of an Australian consulting firm, International Energy Consultants, the Philippines has the highest electricity rate in Asia, followed by Japan. Transmitting power and transporting fuel throughout the Philippine archipelago is problematic due to very high cost. Compared with neighboring Asian developing countries, the Philippines has relatively higher electricity prices due to the country's dependence on imported fossil fuels, no government subsidy on electricity generation, fully cost-reflective, monopolized, and heavily taxed across the supply chain.

The Philippines could be considered a world leader in renewable energy, with its 30 percent of its power generation being powered by the renewable energy sector. The Philippines is the world's second largest generator of geothermal energy and was the first Southeast Asian nation to invest in large-scale solar and wind technologies.

Promotion and support of renewable energy in the country was intensified with the passing of the Renewable Energy Act of 2008 which made a feed-in-tariff and a renewable portfolio standard. The Philippines aims to triple renewable energy supply by 2030.

Recently the government has concluded agreements with private developers for extensive projects in Oriental Mindoro with an eventual output of 48 MW, with plans for even larger development in the future. Despite government efforts, some investors have criticized the government's lack of firmness in its feed-in-tariff policy, and the solar industry accused the government for hampering its progress in the country.

=== Africa ===
==== Algeria ====
On February 3, 2011, Algeria launched the National Development Programme for new and renewable energy and energy efficiency. The program, which spans the period from 2011 to 2013, aims to produce 22,000 MW of electricity from solar and wind power which 10,000 MW for export.

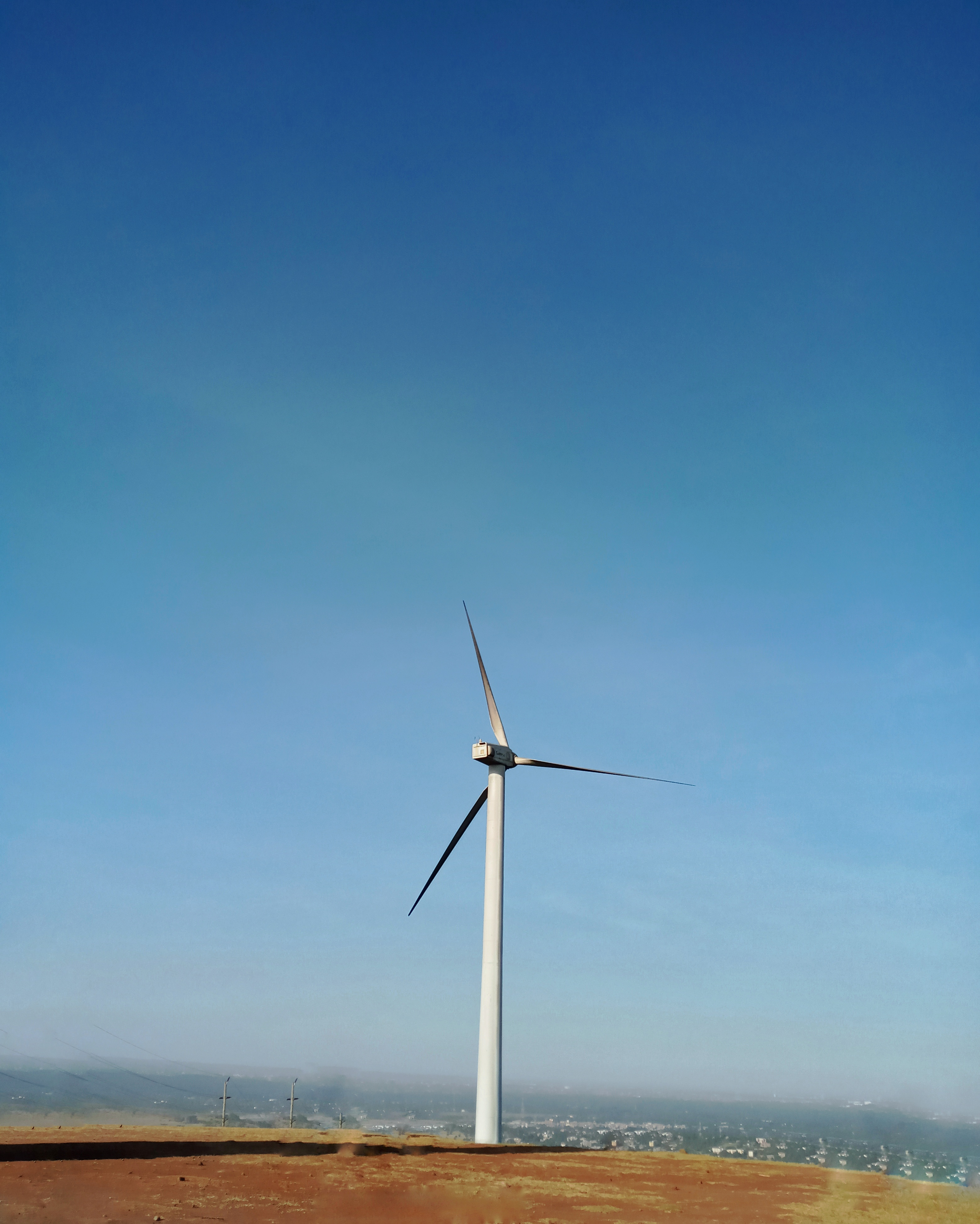
Wind turbine at Ngong Hills in Kenya

==== Kenya ====
In Kenya, the Ministry of Energy and Petroleum is in charge of renewable energy policies. In March 2008, the country adopted the feed-in tariff policy. In January 2010, the policy was revised to urge private sectors to invest in electricity generation from renewable sources.

Kenya was the first African country to use geothermal power, and still has the largest installed capacity of geothermal power in Africa at 200 MW, with a potential of up to 10 GW. The only other country in Africa utilising geothermal power is Ethiopia.

Kenya has progressed to using wind energy as part of their goal of using more renewable energy. In 2022, they had used wind turbines to generate a large amount of their country's with over 6,844 GWh being produced. It was primary being produced in Kenya's wind farm projects such as the Lake Turkana Wind Power project, which has help Kenya to tap into their ever last source of wind.

Kenya is the world leader in the number of solar power systems installed per capita (but not the number of watts added). More than 30,000 small solar panels, each producing 12 to 30 watts, are sold in Kenya annually. For an investment of as little as $100 for the panel and wiring, the PV system can be used to charge a car battery, which can then provide power to run a fluorescent lamp or a small television for a few hours a day. More Kenyans are turning to solar power every year rather than making connections to the country's electric grid. This is due to the high connectivity costs and the fact that there is an abundance of solar power in Kenya.

=== Latin America and the Caribbean ===
In 2021, the European Investment Bank supported the renewable energy sector with €315 million in loans to two private sector project developers. Most of the loans in the area were made towards climate change and environmental sustainability, to public sector borrowers.

The European Investment Bank is also collaborating with a private equity fund called GEF Latam Climate Solutions Fund to invest $200 million in small and medium-sized firms in Latin America that support climate action and environmental sustainability. This investment aims to contribute to the achievement of the Sustainable Development Goals, specifically in climate change mitigation.

==== Brazil ====
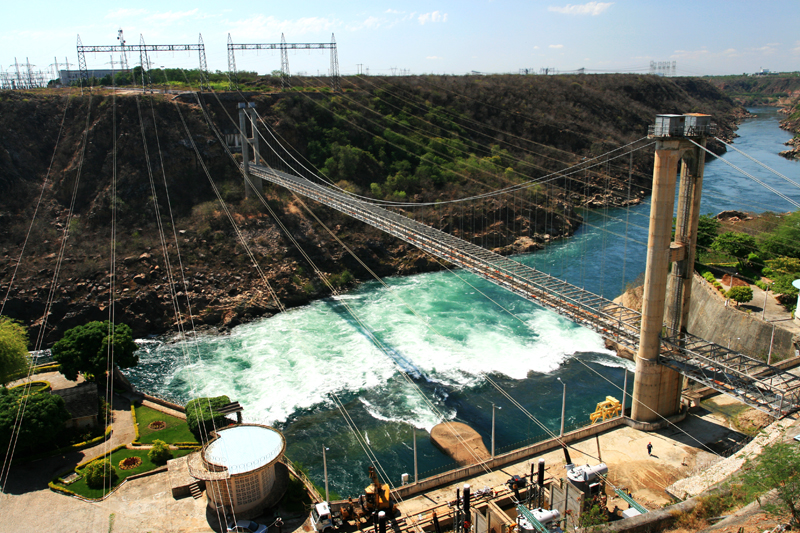
Paulo Afonso Hydroelectric Powerplant in the State of Bahia

Renewable energy accounted for more than 85.4% of the domestically produced electricity used in Brazil, according to preliminary data from the 2009 National Energy Balance, conducted by the Energy Research Corporation (EPE). After the oil shocks of the 1970s, Brazil started focusing on developing alternative sources of energy, mainly sugarcane ethanol. Its large sugarcane farms helped. In 1985, 91% of cars produced that year ran on sugarcane ethanol. The success of flexible-fuel vehicles, introduced in 2003, together with the mandatory E25 blend throughout the country, have allowed ethanol fuel consumption in the country to achieve a 50% market share of the gasoline-powered fleet by February 2008.

In 2021, the country started establishing wind farms in the states of Paraiba, Piau and Bahia, and solar photovoltaic plants in Paraiba.

==== Costa Rica ====
Renewable energy in Costa Rica accounts for over 90% of the total output of the nation's energy. The country is the world leader in renewable use with massive investment in windmill technologies. The government's aim is to make the country the world's first carbon neutral country.

In March 2015 the whole country was running over 75 straight days on 100% renewable energy.

==== Colombia ====
Colombia is now one of the most dynamic renewable energy markets in Latin America, aided by the country's clean energy transition strategy.

Historically, Colombia has depended on hydroelectric power and fossil fuels, because of this, the nation has decided to diversity its electric matrix through expanding in non-conventional renewable energy sources, such as solar and wind power.

Hydroelectric power is now, still the primary source of electricity in Colombia; however, the government has implemented policies to increase the participation of solar and wind power. According to a 2023 energy policy review by the International Agency of Energy (IAE).Colombia has significant potential for the expansion of its renewable energies because of the geography and resources within the Colombian nation. Precisely, to the equatorial location the country has, which provides high levels of social radiation and its regions count with strong wind resources; such regions like La Guajira, located in the North of Colombia. Because of this, the country has implemented new regulatory reforms to attract private investment for the infrastructure of renewable energies.

The energetic transition in Colombia also includes policies meant to support the local development. Among these initiatives, we find the creation of “energetic communities” which seek expanding the generation of renewable energy in rural and marginalized areas.

In addition to increasing the renewable capacity, Colombia has promoted legal and regulatory frameworks to facilitate the investment in clean and efficient energy. The national plans of power transition include wind and solar parks on a large scale. These efforts position Colombia as an example of a key country in development, that seeks for the expansion of renewable energies along with its goals of economic growth and social inclusion.

However, even though there are notable advances, there are still challenges in these improvements. Among the limitations, we can find obstacles in infrastructure, regulatory processes and the necessity to modernize the electric grid to be able to integrate the new renewable sources of energy. Nevertheless, it is expected that with the continuing political reforms and the rising investment, there will be an increase in the renewable capacity, and the transition of Colombia to a more diverse and sustainable energetic system its expected to be supported.

== Recent Developments in Financing Renewable Energy ==
In February 2024, the International Energy Agency (IEA) released the "World Energy Investment Special Report: Reducing the Cost of Capital," which underscores the urgent need for increased investment in clean energy initiatives within developing countries to meet global climate and energy targets. The report delineates that current annual investments, totalling approximately US$270 billion, need to escalate to around US$870 billion by the early 2030s to adhere to national climate commitments, and must further increase to US$1.6 trillion to align with the objectives of limiting global warming to 1.5 degrees Celsius.

Despite a global rise in clean energy investments, which saw an increase of 40% since 2020 to reach US$1.8 trillion in 2023, a mere 15% has been allocated to developing countries. This allocation is notably inadequate given that these countries constitute about one-third of global GDP and two-thirds of the global population. The disproportionately high cost of capital in these regions, often more than double that in developed economies due to elevated perceptions of political and economic risks, acts as a significant impediment to securing necessary funds. To combat these challenges, the IEA report advocates for the enhancement of regulatory frameworks, an increase in international support, and a substantial expansion of concessional finance, aimed at tripling the current efforts to effectively bridge the investment gap in renewable energy sectors of developing countries.

== See also ==
- Agency for Non-conventional Energy and Rural Technology
- Ashden Awards for Sustainable Energy
- Clean-burning stove
- Gaspar Makale
- Global Solar Atlas
- Global Wind Atlas
- International Renewable Energy Agency
- Renewable energy in Africa
- Renewable energy in Asia
- Solar powered refrigerator
- SolarAid
- UN-Energy
- Wind power in Asia
