= Solar-powered refrigerator =

Refrigerator powered by solar energy

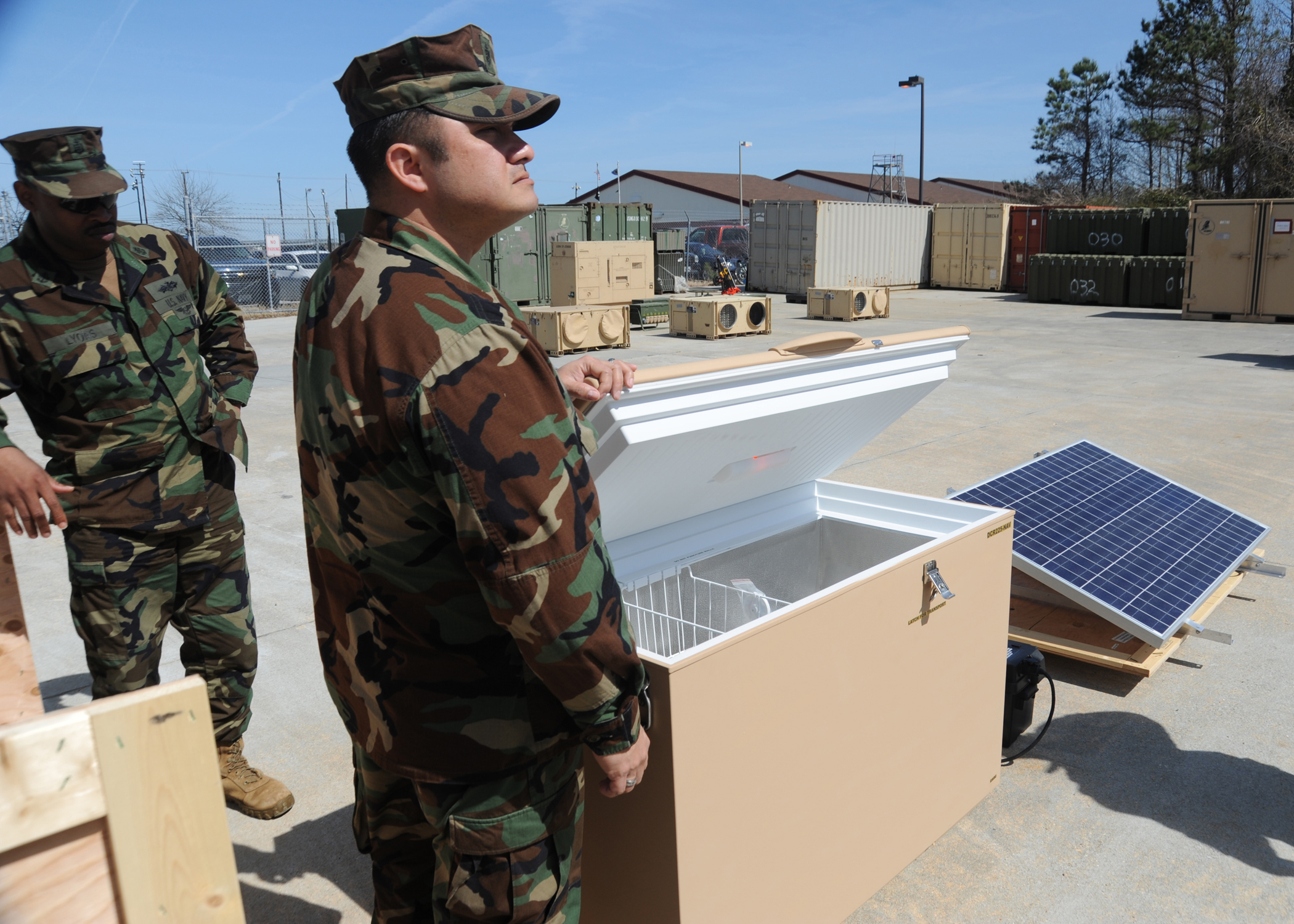
Naval Special Warfare support technicians receive special training on a solar-powered refrigerator.

A solar-powered refrigerator is a refrigerator which runs on energy directly provided by sun, and may include photovoltaic or solar thermal energy.

Solar-powered refrigerators are able to keep perishable goods such as meat and dairy cool in hot climates and are used to keep vaccines at their appropriate temperature to avoid spoilage.

Solar-powered refrigerators are typically used in off-the-grid locations where utility-provided AC power is not available.

== History ==
In 1878, at the Universal Exhibition in Paris, Augustin Mouchot displayed Mouchot's engine and won a gold medal in Class 54 for his works, most notably the production of ice using concentrated solar heat.

"In developed countries, plug-safely, but in developing countries, where electricity supplies can be unreliable, alternative refrigeration technologies are required". Solar fridges were introduced in the developing world to cut down on the use of kerosene or gas-powered absorption refrigerated coolers which are the most common alternatives. They are used for vaccine storage and household applications in areas without reliable electrical supply because they have poor or no grid electricity. They burn a liter of kerosene per day therefore requiring a constant supply of fuel which is costly and smelly, and are responsible for the production of large amounts of carbon dioxide. They can also be difficult to adjust which can result in the freezing of medicine. The use of Kerosene as a fuel is now widely discouraged for three reasons: The recurrent cost of fuel, the difficulty of maintaining accurate temperature, and risk of causing fires.

In 2019, a solar powered portable refrigerator utilizing a brushless compressor, a lithium battery, and solar panels was introduced. This unit is able to keep food and drinks cold without ice and can charge the phone as well.

== Technology ==
Solar-powered refrigerators are characterized by thick insulation and the use of a DC (not AC) compressor. Traditionally solar-powered refrigerators and vaccine coolers use a combination of solar panels and lead batteries to store energy for cloudy days and at night in the absence of sunlight to keep their contents cool. These fridges are expensive and require heavy lead-acid batteries which tend to deteriorate, especially in hot climates, or are misused for other purposes. In addition, the batteries require maintenance, must be replaced approximately every three years, and must be disposed of as hazardous wastes possibly resulting in lead pollution. These problems and the resulting higher costs have been obstacles to using solar-powered refrigerators in developing areas.

In the mid-1990s, NASA JSC began work on a solar-powered refrigerator that used phase change material rather than battery to store thermal energy rather than chemical energy. The resulting technology has been commercialized and is being used for storing food products and vaccines. Solar direct-drive refrigerators don't require batteries, instead using thermal energy to solar power. These refrigerators are increasingly being used to store vaccines in remote areas.

== Use ==
Solar-powered refrigerators and other solar appliances are commonly used by individuals living off-the-grid. They provide a means for keeping food safe and preserved while avoiding a connection to utility-provided power. Solar refrigerators are also used in cottages and camps as an alternative to absorption refrigerators, as they can be safely left running year-round. Other uses include being used to keep medical supplies at proper temperatures in remote locations, and being used to temporarily store game at hunting camps.

== See also ==
- Renewable energy in developing countries
- SolarAid
- Solar power in South Asia
- UN-Energy
