= Energy for All =

Initiative and partnership

Energy for All is the name of an initiative and partnership, both of which are founded by the Asian Development Bank (ADB), to reduce energy poverty in Asia and the Pacific.

The initiative aims to develop approaches for providing access to reliable and affordable energy services and scaling them up. That includes household access to electricity from renewable energy technologies such as micro-hydro, solar, biomass, and small wind power and access to clean cooking fuel such as liquefied petroleum gas and biogas from livestock manure. The partnership was created to allow entities from different sectors in the region to cooperate. Its stated goal is to provide access to energy to 100 million people in the region by 2015.

== Working groups ==
There are currently seven working groups in the partnership.

=== Domestic Biogas ===
Convener: SNV Netherlands Development Organisation Target: Deploy 1 million domestic biogas plants for 5 million people and develop sustainable commercial biogas sectors in 15 countries in Asia and the Pacific by 2016.

=== Lighting for All ===
Convener: The Energy and Resource Institute (TERI)

Target: Expand access to off-grid lighting solutions for 50 million people by 2015.

=== Liquified Petroleum Gas ===
Convener: World LP Gas Association

Target: Expand distribution of LP Gas to remote communities while creating sustainable markets.

=== Enterprise Development ===
Convener: Sustainable Energy Association of Singapore (SEAS)

Target: Develop clean energy enterprises in the region through public-private partnership models and a network of industry associations, institutions and relevant government bodies.

=== The Pacific Region ===
Convener: Renewable Energy and Energy Efficiency Partnership (REEEP)

Target: Scale up proven models for energy access and disseminate successful approaches throughout the Pacific island countries.

=== Wind Power ===
Convener: Korea Wind Energy Industry Association

Target: Deploy small wind power for electrification and productive use in remote areas in Asia and the Pacific region.
