= SolarAid =

International development charity

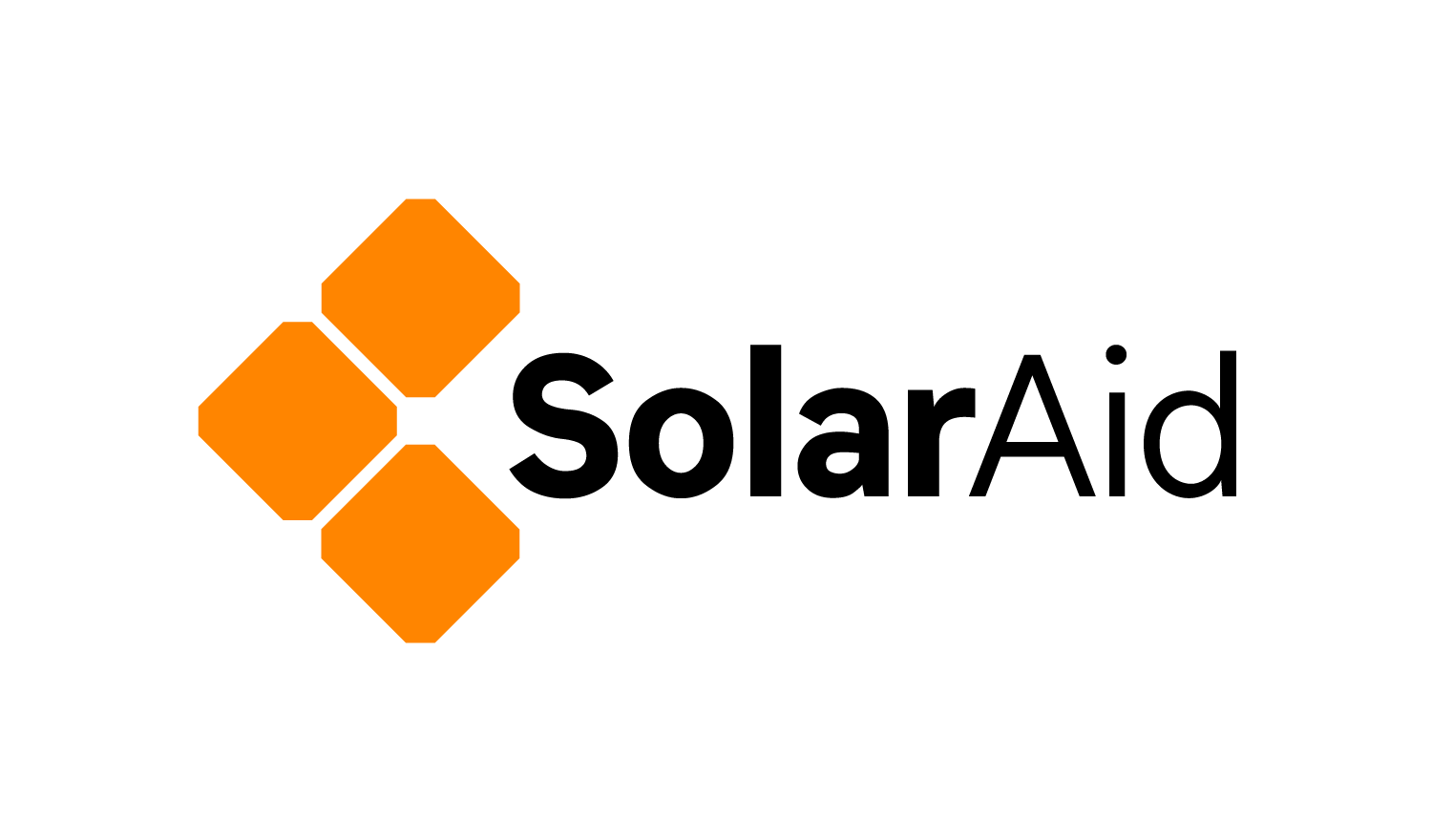
- Formation: 2006
- Founder: Jeremy Leggett
- Type: International Development charity
- Purpose: Solar market catalysation
- Location: London, England
- Region served: Africa
- Product: Solar lamps, lanterns and home-systems
- Employees: 100+
- Website: solar-aid.org

SolarAid is an international development charity which is working to create a sustainable market for solar lights in Africa. In line with the Sustainable Development Goal 7: "Ensure access to affordable, reliable, sustainable and modern energy for all", the organisation's aim is to reduce global poverty and climate change through providing access to solar lights for rural communities. SolarAid wholly owns the social enterprise, SunnyMoney, the largest seller of solar lights in Africa. SolarAid was founded by Solarcentury, a solar energy company based in the UK.

== Aims and focus ==
SolarAid aims to light up every home, school and clinic in Africa by 2030, using safe, clean, solar power. The charity's social enterprise, SunnyMoney, operates in Zambia and Malawi. SolarAid also work through partners in Uganda and Senegal in West Africa.

== Awards ==
SolarAid is the recipient of a 2013 Google Global Impact Award, a 2013 Guardian Sustainable Business Award. and the 2013 Ashden Gold Award.

== See also ==
- Renewable energy in developing countries
- Solar lamp
- UN-Energy
