= Renewable energy in Asia =

Asia may help lead the renewable energy era. Here is how Ember describes it: Electricity is now the fastest-growing type of energy use, and it has surpassed oil usage globally. Asia is the fastest-growing region and it has driven 75 percent of the growth of electricity. Ember said the second trend is that energy is shifting from extraction to manufacturing. Here is where Asia excels. China is the main player, but so are Vietnam, Bangladesh and Thailand. Then came Russia's invasion of Ukraine and the Iran War. This forced the region to try to diversify its energy usage.

A story in Forbes by Ian Dexter Palmer, highlights how Asia is turning to renewables. "While current policy in the U.S. is bent on oil and gas saving the world, while diminishing the role of solar and wind renewables, the exact opposite is happening in many Asian countries. The shift has tremendous potential to alter the base of energy security in these countries, and to save hundreds of billions of dollars."

For solar power, South Asia has the ideal combination of both high solar insolation and a high density of potential customers.

Cheap solar can bring electricity to a major chunk of subcontinent's people who still live off-grid, bypassing the need of installation of expensive grid lines. Also since the costs of energy consumed for temperature control squarely influences a regions energy intensity, and with cooling load requirements roughly in phase with the sun's intensity, cooling from intense solar radiation could make perfect energy-economic sense in the subcontinent.

== Renewable energy by country ==
=== Afghanistan ===
Renewable energy in Afghanistan is seeing significant growth and development, tapping into the country's rich natural resources. The country's hydroelectric potential is notably high, with rivers capable of producing an estimated 23,000 MW of power. Currently, hydropower installations include both large-scale plants and smaller micro-hydropower schemes, cumulatively amounting to approximately 293 MW. Afghanistan's solar energy prospects are also promising, given its status as a "sunbelt country" with an average Global Horizontal Irradiance of 1,935 kWh/m^2 annually. Solar power, predominantly used for lighting in rural areas, has reached an installed capacity of about 13 MW, largely through standalone systems. Wind energy, particularly in the Herat, Balkh, and Parwan provinces, presents a theoretical potential of 158 GW, with economically feasible installations around 1,000 MW. However, current wind power installations are estimated at just 300 kW. Additionally, biogas production from rural livestock manure and energy generation from urban solid waste contribute to the renewable energy mix, with several biogas digesters already operational. These developments align with Afghanistan's broader energy goals, including substantial renewable energy targets and policy frameworks aimed at enhancing sustainable energy access and reducing environmental impacts.

=== Bangladesh ===
In Bangladesh, biomass, hydro, and solar are the main sources of renewable energy, and altogether these sources contribute about 60% of the nation's primary energy supply. A number of domestic solar energy systems are in use in houses around the country. The use of solar energy on this scale is highly potential and advantageous, as more than 60% of areas in the country do not have access to main grid electricity. The World Bank is backing a program of making solar energy available to a wider population in Bangladesh, as part of the Rural Electrification and Renewable Energy Development Project (REREDP), which subsidizes solar energy systems.

A typical 'solar home system' can power two to eight 'low energy' lights, plus a socket for TV, radio or battery recharging, and a mobile telephone charging unit, too. Each system consists of a solar photovoltaic panel, mounted on the house roof. Depending on its size, this provides between 40W and 135W of electricity in full sunlight (the most common being 50W).

Grameen Shakti is the largest organization installing rural-based solar home systems (SHS) in Bangladesh. Other companies working on similar solar energy based SHS are Rural Services Foundation (RSF), Brac, Hilfulfujal and so on. The model of microfinance-based SHS is now being copied in other parts of the world aHilfulfujal,ful business model.

Rahimafrooz is a major supplier of high quality solar batteries and other solar components for the program. Rahimafrooz Renewable Energy Ltd (RRE) has been the pioneer in installing solar powered centralized systems, water pumps for irrigation and pure drinking water, water heaters, street lights, and solar-powered telecom solutions to various organizations. They are working closely with pertinent government organizations in installing solar-powered medical refrigerators that provide emergency live saving medicines in the off-grid rural areas.

=== Bhutan ===
Bhutan has an estimated hydropower potential of 30,000 MW, of which, 23,760 has been identified and assessed to be technically feasible. The Punatsangchhu-I Hydroelectric Project (PHEP-I) is a 1200 MW Hydroelectric facility that is being built in collaboration with Bhutan and India.

=== China ===
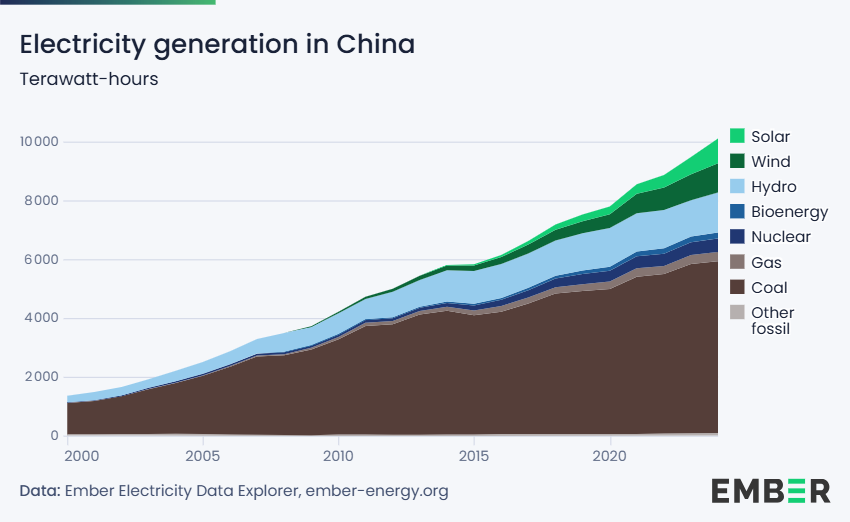
Electricity generation in China - terawatt hours

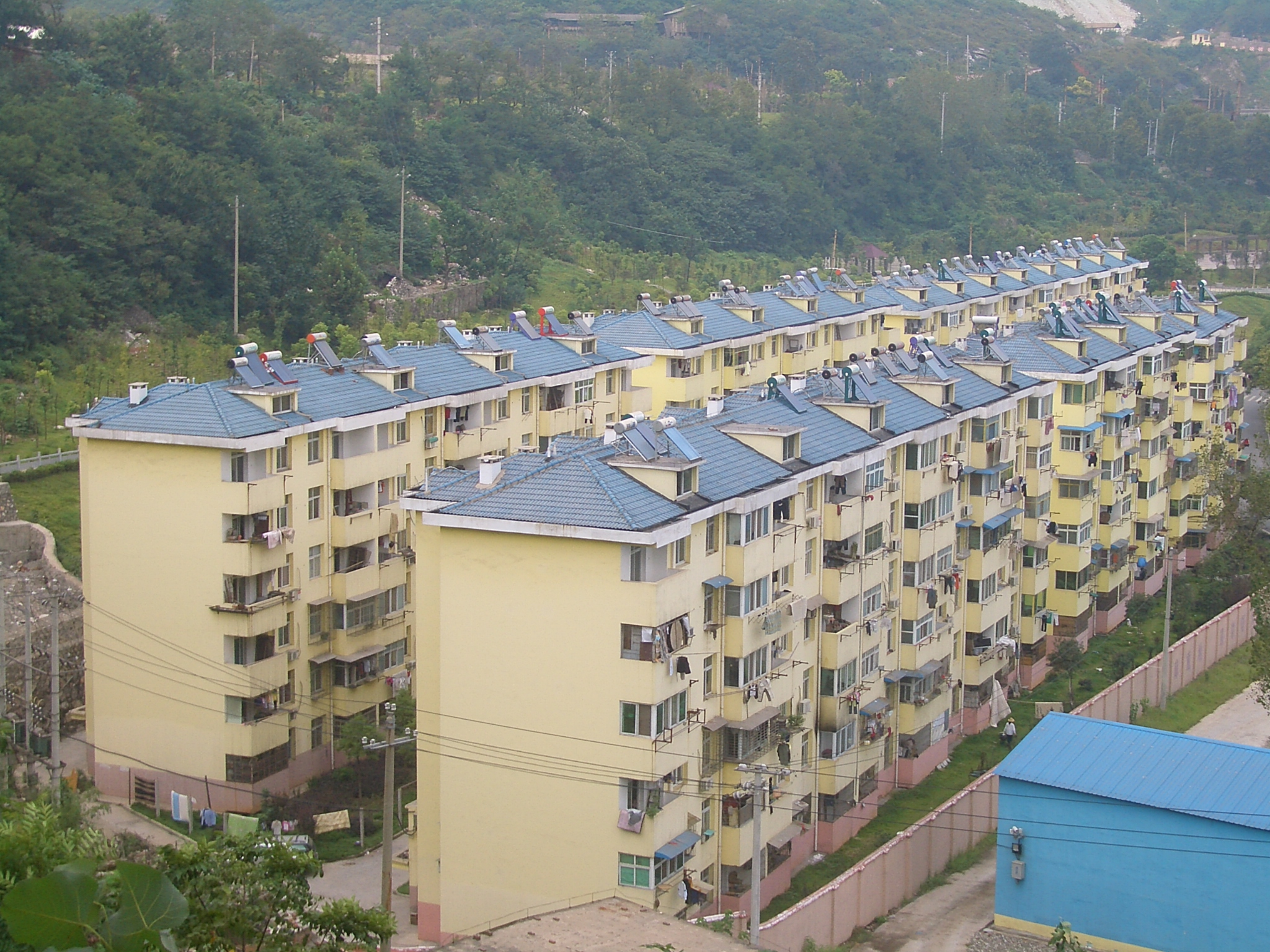
Rooftop solar water heaters are ubiquitous in modern China

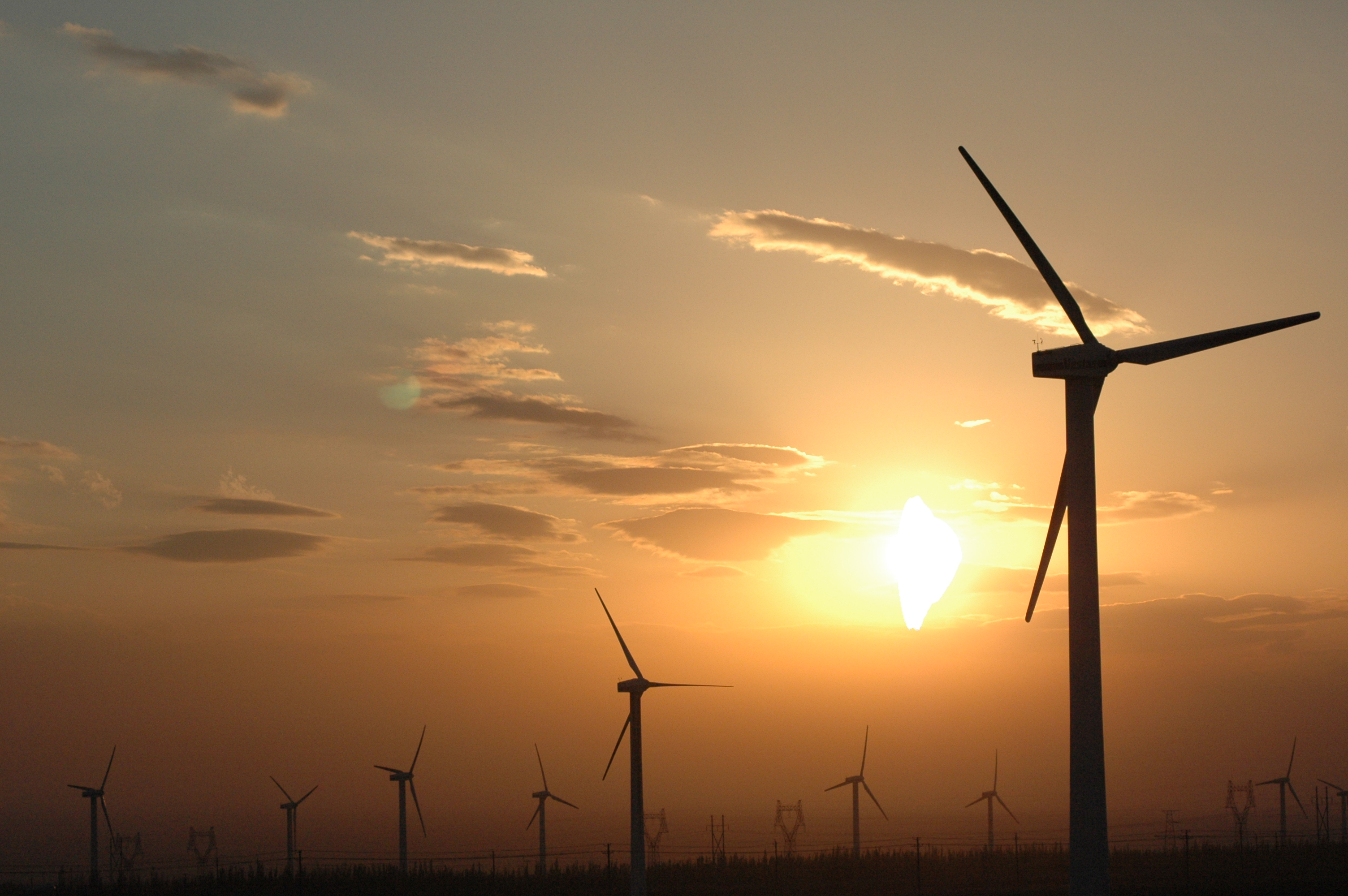
Wind farm in Xinjiang, China

In China there now are six factories producing at least 2 GW/year each of monocrystalline, poly-crystalline and non-crystalline Photovoltaic cells. These factories include the LDK Solar Co, Wuxi Suntech Solar Energy Co., Ltd., which produces approximately 50 MW/year of solar cells and photovoltaic modules; the Yunnan Semi-conductor Parts Plant, which manufactures approximately 2 MW/year of mono-crystalline cells; the Baoding Yingli Solar Energy Modules Plant, which manufactures approximately 6 MW/year of polycrystalline cells and modules; the Shanghai Jiaoda Guofei Solar Energy Battery Factory, which produces approximately 1 MW/year of modules; and the Shanghai PV Science and Technology Co., Ltd., which produces approximately 5 MW/year of modules.

China has become a world leader in the manufacture of solar photovoltaic technology, with its six biggest solar companies having a combined value of over $15 billion. In 2023 majority of its electricity capacity came from renewable energy. Around 820 megawatts of solar PV were produced in China in 2007, second only to Japan. Suntech Power Holdings Co based in Jiangsu, is the world's third- biggest supplier of solar cells.

There are some obstacles to the further development of the Chinese solar energy sector that China faces. These obstacles include the lack of a nationwide comprehensive photovoltaic (PV) plan, the lack of updated facilities and sufficient financial resources to support PV research at research institutes, the lack of sufficient facilities and resources at companies manufacturing PV products, the failure of companies to be able to produce high quality, reliable and low cost PV products and the relatively weak educational and training opportunities in China for PV science and technology.

About 50 MW of installed solar capacity was added in 2008, more than double the 20 MW in 2007, but still a relatively small amount. According to some studies, the demand in China for new solar modules could be as high as 232 MW each year from now on until 2012. The government has announced plans to expand the installed capacity to 1,800 MW by 2020. If Chinese companies manage to develop low cost, reliable solar modules, then the sky is the limit for a country that is desperate to reduce its dependence on coal and oil imports as well as the pressure on its environment by using renewable energy.

In 2009 centre to the PRC Government's plans is the recently announced "Golden Sun" stimulus program. Under this program the Ministry of Finance will subsidize half of the total construction costs of an on-grid solar power plant, including transmission expenses. The Ministry of Finance will also pay subsidies of up to 70% to develop independent photovoltaic power generating systems in remote regions. The strong handed move by the Government is meant to encourage more solar projects to increase the current solar power capacity, which at 2008 stood at a paltry 40MW. As the Government targets to increase China's solar power capacity up to 20GW by 2020, this will provide significant opportunities for solar cell and module manufacturers. Many of the solar industry players therefore will expect for chances to be benefited from the government programs especially the solar cell manufacturers. With the hope of increase in local demand, some of the new developments have been going on with this region, like Anwell Technologies Limited, a Singapore listed company having its solar cell manufacturing plant in China, has produced its first thin film solar panel with its own developed production lines in September 2009.

According to the speech given by the Chinese President Hu Jintao's at the UN climate summit held on September 22, 2009, in New York, China will intensify effort and adopt ambitious plans to plant enough forest to cover an area the size of Norway and use 15 percent of its energy from renewable sources within a decade.

=== India ===
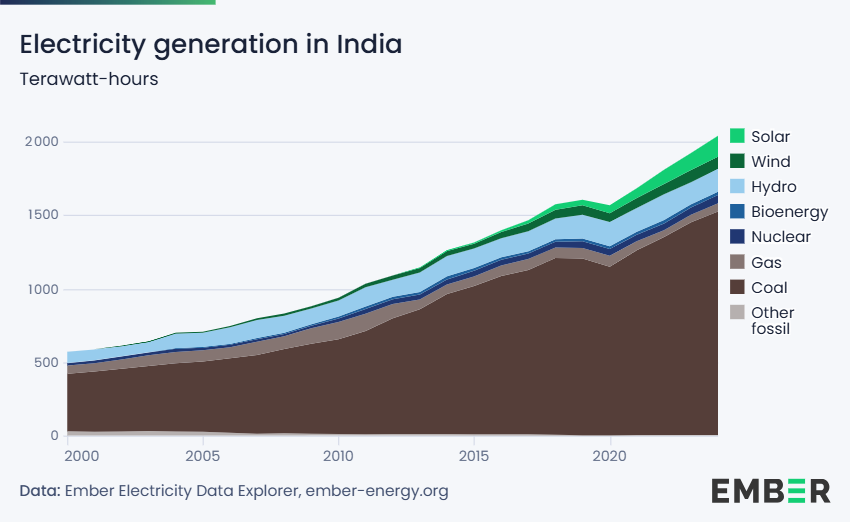
Electricity generation in India - terawatt hours

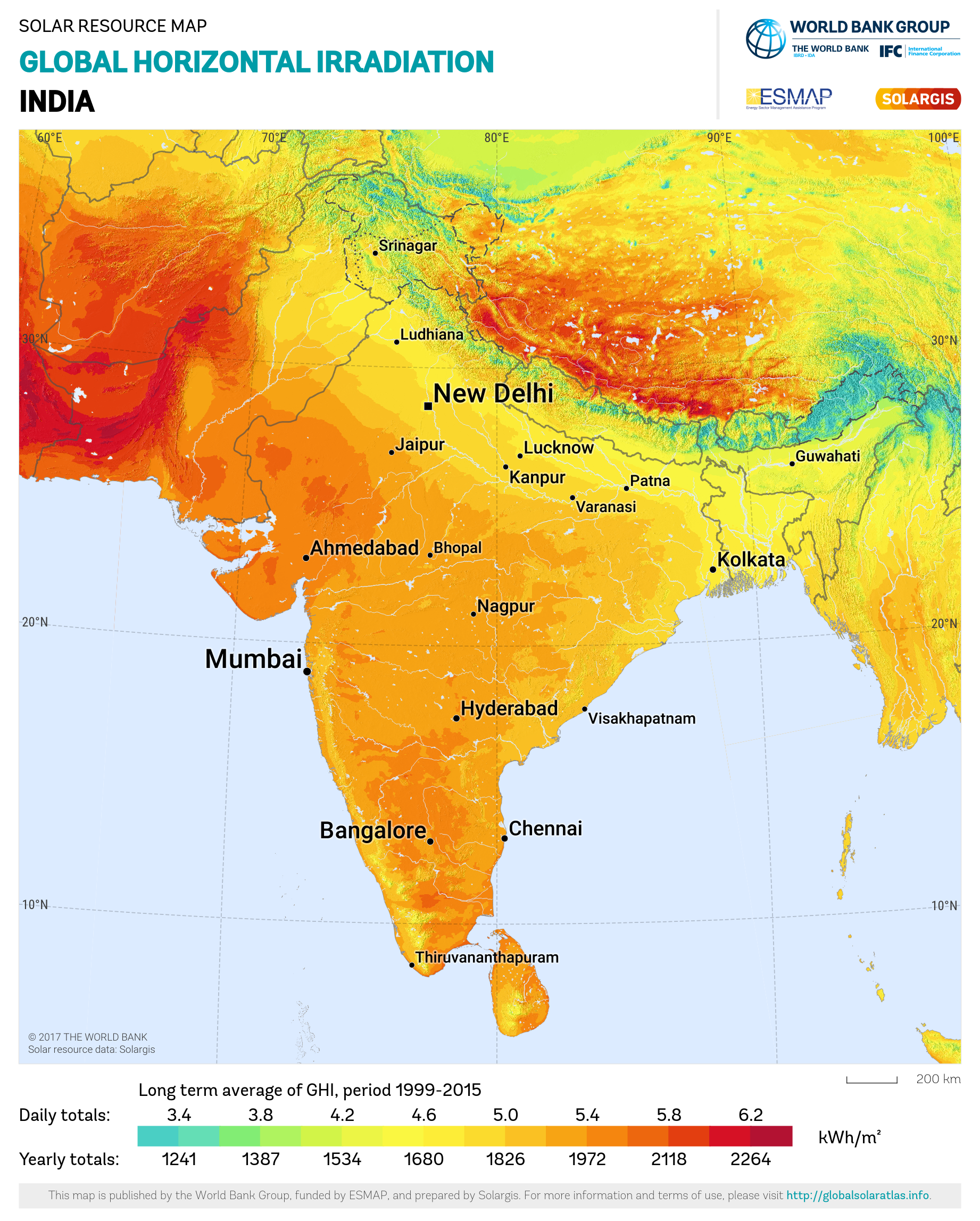
Global Horizontal Irradiation in India. l

India is both densely populated and has high solar insolation, providing an ideal combination for solar power in India. Much of the country does not have an electrical grid, so one of the first applications of solar power has been for water pumping, to begin replacing India's four to five million diesel powered water pumps, each consuming about 3.5 kilowatts, and off-grid lighting. Some large projects have been proposed, and a 35,000 km^{2} area of the Thar Desert has been set aside for solar power projects, sufficient to generate 700 to 2,100 gigawatts.

The Indian Solar Loan Programme, supported by the United Nations Environment Programme has won the prestigious Energy Globe World award for Sustainability for helping to establish a consumer financing program for solar home power systems. Over the span of three years more than 16,000 solar home systems have been financed through 2,000 bank branches, particularly in rural areas of South India where the electricity grid does not yet extend.

Launched in 2003, the Indian Solar Loan Programme was a four-year partnership between UNEP, the UNEP Risoe Centre, and two of India's largest banks, the Canara Bank and Syndicate Bank.

According to Development Counsellors International (DCI), a United States marketing company, India is the second best country, after China, for business investment. United Nations Environment Programme (UNEP) has reported that India has seen a 12% increase in investment in the renewable energy sector with an investment of $3.7 billion in 2008. The largest share was asset finance at $3.2 billion which grew by 25%. The clean renewable energy includes wind, solar, biomass and small-hydro projects. The major portion of investment has been made in wind energy sector. The investment in wind energy sector grew at 17% from $2.2 billion to $2.6 billion.

=== Indonesia ===
While Indonesia has made strides in financial mechanisms and tax incentives to support renewable energy, the country has struggled to meet its renewable energy targets due to inefficient power system policies and grid management practices. The Ministry of Finance has shown a commitment to fostering geothermal energy, which remains a significant component of Indonesia's renewable energy landscape. As of 2018, renewable power constituted 44% of the nation's energy profile, with estimates suggesting a slight decrease to 42% by 2028, as projected by Perusahaan Listrik Negara (PLN). This projected decrease is partly due to challenges in fully harnessing geothermal resources, which are predominantly located on the islands of Java and Sumatera.

Indonesia possesses a high potential for renewable energy, estimated at 419 gigawatts (GW), including substantial capacities in hydro (75 GW), geothermal (23.7 GW), bioenergy (32.6 GW), solar (207.8 GW), wind (60.6 GW), and micro-hydro (19.3 GW). The country's energy consumption pattern reveals a significant reliance on oil, particularly in the transportation sector which consumes about 45.76% of the energy. The industrial and household sectors also show considerable energy usage for purposes such as boiler steam generation and electricity.

Despite these potentials and consumption trends, the transition from fossil fuels to renewable energy sources has been gradual. The government has planned to increase the renewable energy mix from 11% in 2021 to 23% by 2025, and further to 31% by 2050, aligning with national policies aimed at reducing greenhouse gas emissions and enhancing energy security. This transition is essential for Indonesia as it aims to meet its nationally determined contributions under the Paris Agreement and strive for net-zero emissions by 2060.

=== Israel ===
As of 2019, Israel's renewable energy production capacity stood at 1,500 MW, almost all of it from solar energy, at 1,438 MW. Additional sources included wind power (27 MW), biogas (25 MW), hydroelectric power (7 MW) and other bio energy (3 MW). Of the solar energy, photovoltaics accounted for 1,190 MW, while concentrated solar power contributed another 248 MW from the Ashalim Power Station.

In 2021, the renewable energy generation in Israel was 5.7 TWh, which was almost a 30% increase from 2020. Solar energy generation was 95% of the total renewable energy generation in 2021.

=== Japan ===
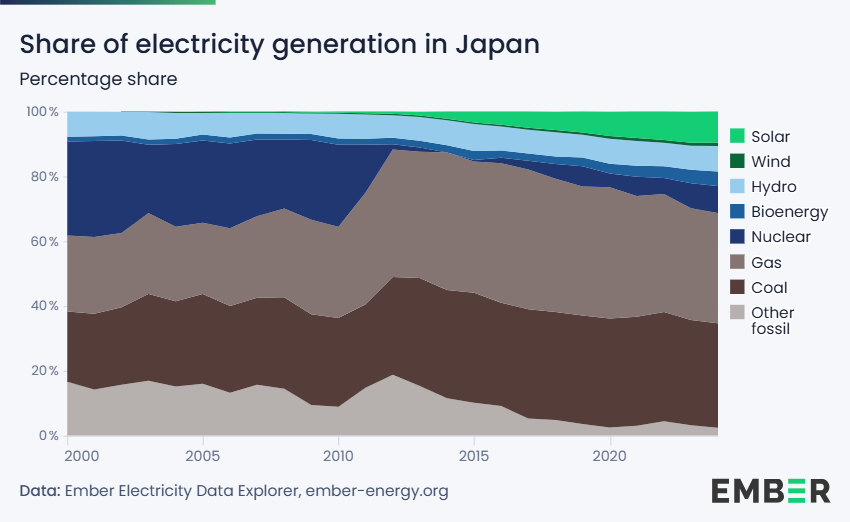
Share of electricity generation in Japan - percentage share

Japan first started investing in renewable energy in the 1970s and 1980s with the oil crisis. Japan was hit extremally hard due to their rapidly developing economy relying heavily on fossil fuels most of which were imported. The steep prices on fossil fuels caused Japan to invest lots of money into their growing nuclear industry as well as other forms of renewable energy such as solar, wind, and hydroelectric. Japan set a goal in October 2021 to have 36%-38% of their total power generation come from renewable sources and they have a further goal to become completely carbon neutral by the year 2050

Japan invested heavily into nuclear energy starting in 1966 when it opened its first nuclear power plant. The country would continue to establish new nuclear power plants and improve on nuclear technology until the year 2011 when the Fukushima Daiichi nuclear disaster occurred. In 2010, nuclear energy made up almost 25% of Japan's energy output, in 2015, this number was recorded at a low 0.4%. Public backlash from citizens across the country forced the government to quickly shut down the remain reactors across the entire nation. As nuclear power was a large part of Japan's power generation, the Japanese government was forced to quickly find other energy sources to meet the country's massive energy demand leading them to turn to fossil fuels as a quick and cheap solution. Since 2011, the nation has slowly been reactivating some of their nuclear power plants with 10 reactors currently operating out of 60 total reactors. The effects of the Fukushima nuclear disaster can still be seen on Japan's nuclear industry with nuclear power making up a fraction of what it did in the 2000s. The government is continuing forward with reactivating reactors in order to meet its goal of becoming carbon neutral by the year 2050.

Japan did not just turn to fossil fuels to fill the gap in energy production left by nuclear, they also began the construction of solar panels and other renewable energy sources. Solar was a clear choice for investment as Japan was the second largest producer of solar energy in the early 2000s behind China. In order to encourage citizens and businesses alike to invest in solar power, the government approved a feed- in tariff that would give people who generated excess power with solar a small amount of money for the power that they generated. The tariff was approved at 42 yen/kwh on June 18, 2012; however, it has since been reduced over time to 11 yen/kwh in 2022. Existing contracts would not see this decrease in cost until they expired. This tariff succeeded in its purpose as Japan saw the second highest growth in solar production in the years 2013 and 2014. In addition, Japan broke several of their goals of increasing solar production early. Hydroelectricity is another important source of renewable energy in Japan, being the second biggest behind solar. Japan has 178 power plants producing power for the country making them the 6th largest producer of hydroelectricity in the world. While hydroelectricity is a key factor in renewable energy production in Japan, it is becoming increasingly difficult for them to expand as dams have been constructed at almost every potential site. Wind and geothermal are additional sources of renewable energy that Japan is developing, and both have seen an increase in total power generated. however, they make up a very small portion of the country's overall energy production. The government is continuing to look into methods of increasing power generation from both of these sources in order to continue progress towards their goal of becoming carbon neutral by 2050.

=== Lebanon ===
As of 2024, Lebanon had 1,373 MW of installed renewable electricity capacity, comprising 1,081 MW of solar photovoltaic and 282 MW of hydropower. Solar accounted for approximately 78.7% of total renewable capacity, while hydropower represented 20.5%.

=== Nepal ===
Nepal, with vast renewable energy potential, is yet to fully exploit resources like hydropower, solar, wind, and bioenergy. The country's energy consumption is dominated by traditional sources, with only 40% of the population having access to electricity. Challenges like geographical constraints, technical limitations, and political and economic factors hinder the sustainable harnessment of these renewable resources. Efforts to develop and implement renewable energy technologies are essential to address environmental and public health issues and reduce reliance on imported fossil fuels.

According to the International Renewable Energy Agency (IRENA), Nepal had approximately 4,030 MW of installed renewable electricity capacity in 2025. Hydropower dominated the country's renewable energy mix, with 3,810 MW, representing approximately 94.5% of total capacity. Solar energy accounted for 213 MW (5.3%).

=== Pakistan ===
Solar power in Pakistan discusses the generation and development of electricity via solar thermal or photovoltaic technology in that country. The country has solar plants in Pakistani Kashmir, Punjab, Sindh and Balochistan. Initiatives are under development by the International Renewable Energy Agency, the Japan International Cooperation Agency, Chinese companies, and Pakistani private sector energy companies. The country aims to build the world's largest solar power park, the Quaid-e-Azam Solar Power Park (QASP) in the Cholistan Desert, Punjab, by 2017 with a 1 GW capacity. A plant of this size would be enough to power around 320,000 homes.

==== Introduction of Clean Energy by Solar Electricity Generation System ====
On May 29, 2012, Pakistan inaugurated its first solar power on-grid power plant in Islamabad. Introduction of Clean Energy by Solar Electricity Generation System is a special grant aid project by the Japan International Cooperation Agency (JICA) under the Coolio Earth Partnership. This project includes the installation of two 178 kW photovoltaic (PV) systems at the premises of the Planning Commission and Pakistan Engineering Council.

This is the first on-grid solar PV project that employs net-metering, thereby allowing the beneficiaries to sell surplus electricity to the Islamabad Electric Supply Company (IESCO), the electricity distribution company of the Islamabad Division. The project was executed with grant assistance, worth 480 million Yen (approx. 553.63 million Pakistani Rupees) over three years commencing in 2010.

==== Other projects ====
Aviation Enclave Karachi installed the first high quality integrated solar energy system with a 15 kW power generation capacity capable of grid tie-in at, Aviation Enclave Karachi in Sep 2016. It was a pilot project for Central Facilitation Agency & Central Builders & Developers

Beaconhouse installed the second high quality integrated solar energy system with a 10 kW power generation capacity capable of grid tie-in at Beaconhouse Canal Side Campus, Lahore. It was a pilot project for BSS designed by U.S. consultants, based upon feasibility by the U.S. Trade and Development Agency (USTDA).

50 to 100 MW of photovoltaics is expected to be installed in 2013, and at least 300 MW in 2014. In May 2015, 100 MW of a planned 1,000 MW were installed in the Quaid-e-Azam Solar Park.

==== Annual solar irradiation ====
Solar irradiance in Pakistan is 5.3 kWh/m^{2}/day. Pakistan set a target to add approximately 10 GW of renewable capacity by 2030 in addition to replacing 5% diesel with biodiesel by 2015 and 10% by 2025.

==== Photovoltaic installations ====
Year Installations in MWp Notes Cumulative Capacity Added Capacity 2014 400 Calculated back from 2015 added capacity data. 2015 1,000 600 Preliminary data.

==== Government policy ====
Raja Pervaiz Ashraf, former Federal Minister of Water & Power announced on July 2, 2009, that 7,000 villages would be electrified using solar energy by 2014. Senior adviser Sardar Zulfiqar Khosa stated that the Punjab government would begin new projects aimed at power production through coal, solar energy and wind power; this would generate additional resources.

The Government of Pakistan allowed the provincial government of Sindh to conduct feasibility research. The government planned to install a desalination plant powered by solar energy.

=== Philippines ===
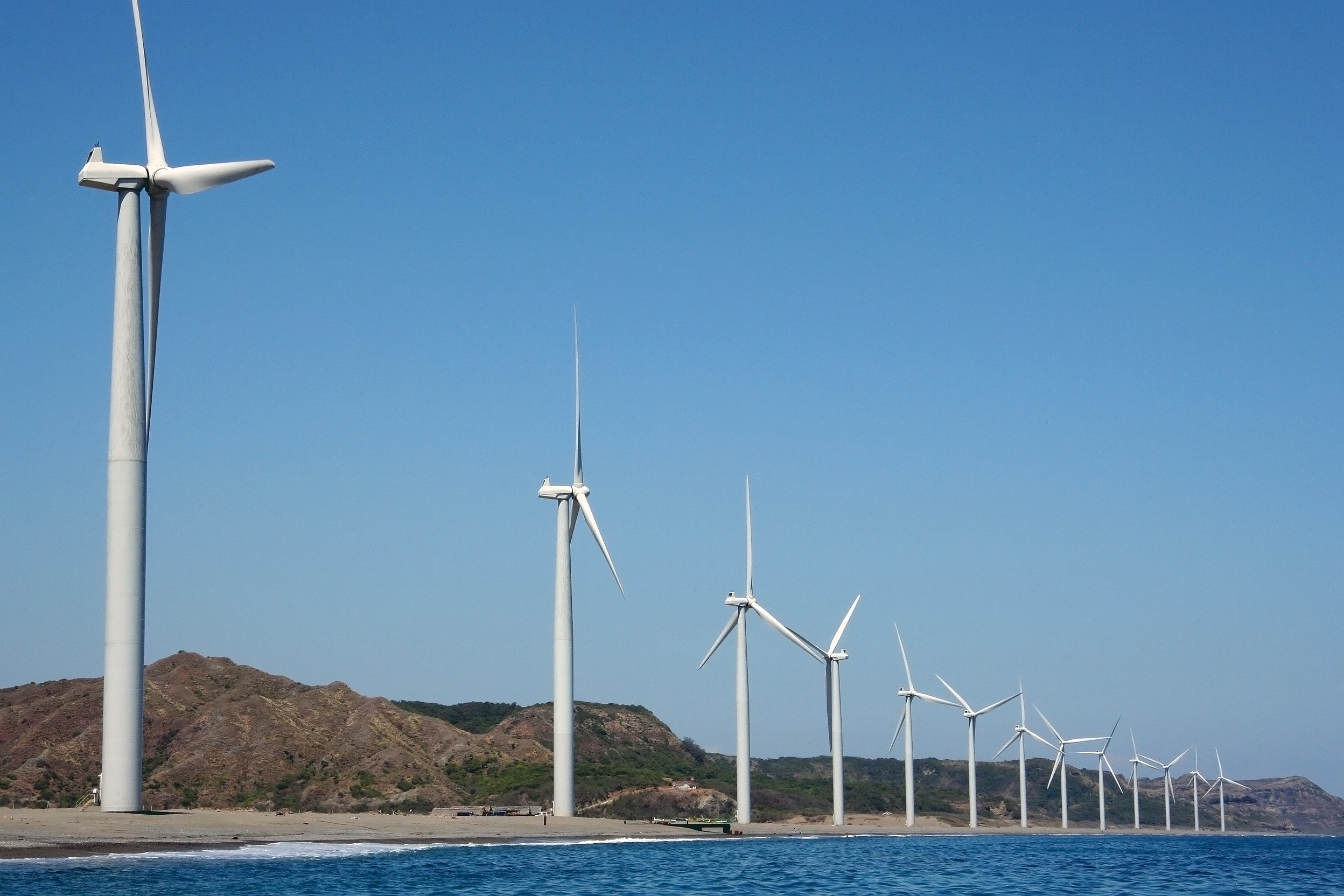
Bangui Wind Farm in Ilocos Norte, Philippines

The Philippine government sees the growth of the renewable energy sector essential for national energy security. The Philippines' fossil fuel sector is unsustainable, being dependent on the import of nonrenewable fuel, including petroleum, but has significant potential in the renewable energy sector. Based on a report of an Australian consulting firm, International Energy Consultants, the Philippines has the highest electricity rate in Asia, followed by Japan. While Thailand, Malaysia, South Korea, Taiwan, and Indonesia have lower electricity prices due to government subsidies in the form of fuel subsidies, cash grants, additional debt, and deferred expenditures, the Philippines has higher prices due to no government subsidy, fully cost-reflective, imported fuel-dependent, and heavy taxes across the supply chain. Transmitting power and transporting fuel throughout the Philippine archipelago is problematic due to very high cost.

The Philippines could be considered one of the world leaders in renewable energy, with 25 percent of its power generation being powered by the renewable energy sector. The Philippines is the world's second largest generator of geothermal energy and was the first Southeast Asian nation to invest in large-scale solar and wind technologies. The country's geographic location in the Pacific makes it a good potential for renewable energy generation with 76.6 GW wind, 10 GW hydropower, 15828 MW solar, 500 MW biomass, 170 GW ocean, and 4 GW geothermal.

=== South Korea ===
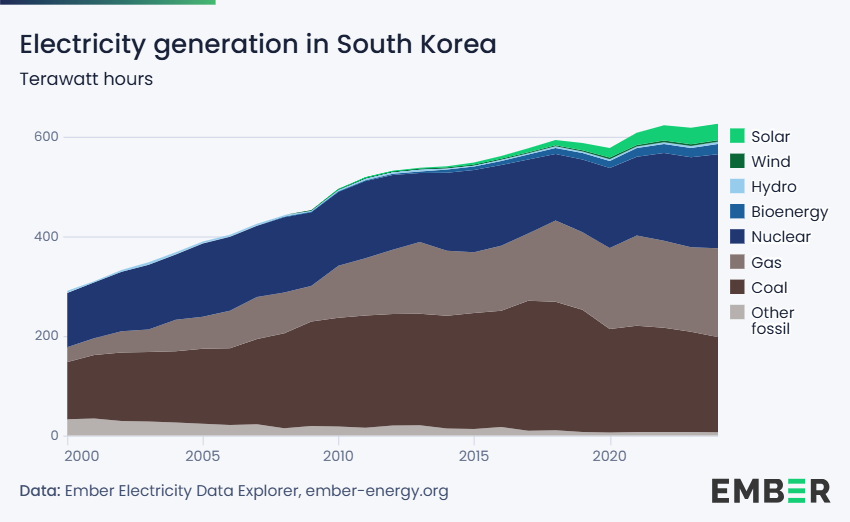
Electricity generation in South Korea - terawatt hours

In 2008, South Korea came 4th in the list of installed PV capacity according to EPIA statistics as a result of the favorable feed-in tariff system with a cap of 500MW in 2008. According to Displaybank, the new "PV Market Creation Plan" announced in 2009 is expected to boost the Korean PV installment market to increase to 200MW by 2012. The government further announced plans to increase more than double its financing for renewable R&D projects to 3.5 trillion won ($2.9/£1.9bn) by 2013. The government also plans to expand its system of tax breaks to cover new technologies in solar such as wind and thermal power, low-emission vehicles and rechargeable batteries etc.

=== Tajikistan ===
After the Soviet Union collapsed in 1991 and successive five-year civil war in Tajikistan came to an end, many of the electricity supply systems of the region failed due to the destruction of the electricity transmission infrastructure during the war and the termination of the Soviet-subsidized diesel fuels that offered most of the power. As a result, many people resorted to cutting trees to provide wood fuel for cooking and heating during the winter. The cutting of trees destroyed almost 70% of the forest cover of the region.

The government of Tajikistan established Pamir Energy in 2002 after receiving financial support from Aga Khan Fund for Economic Development and World Bank. The lack of electricity had resulted in the closure of health centers, businesses, and schools. Instead, people had to use coal, kerosene, firewood, and dung. The fuels were obtained from remote areas resulting in inflated prices of the fuel due to the high transport cost incurred in the process.

With the support of medium and small hydropower plants, Pamir Energy now distributes, generates, and sells pure electricity to 96% of the Tajikistan population together with areas along the border of Afghanistan. The government has subsidized the cost of electricity to make it accessible to the poorest households. The lives of Afghan Badakhshan and Eastern Tajikistan have improved due to the availability of reliable electricity. Homes and schools are now accessed with electricity for heating during the winter. Electricity has also replaced coal, which has helped improve the health of the people of Eastern Tajikistan. Various plants have linked together in the Pamir Energy regional grid, which has ensured the supply of high-quality and reliable electricity to the residents of Eastern Tajikistan.

Pamir Energy provides electricity in two forms: government and commercial entities and another for domestic consumption. The Government of Tajikistan has established a Customer Support Scheme to reduce tariffs to ensure everybody can afford electricity and prevent people from using coal, dung, and wood. Pamir Energy has renovated and established 11 medium and small hydropower plants and has also refurbished 4,300 km of the previous distribution and transmission facilities, reducing transmission cost to 12% from 39%. The capacity of the plants ranges from 137kw to 27 MW, with 43.5 MW as the total capacity. The plants generate 170 GWh of electricity yearly and also service over 34,000 Afghanistan and 220,000 Tajikistan populations.

Customers use collection agents or ATMs to make payments at the district offices of the Pamir Energy network. The company had installed meters to improve the reading of the usage and control supply level and can also terminate supply for defaulting customers. With advancements in the level of technology in Eastern Tajikistan, the system will start accepting mobile payments. Pamir Energy has made every effort to ensure the supply of electricity in the region is maintained for unforeseen future. The company has renovated one plant to 1.5MW to provide electricity supply to over 1000 households in Eastern Tajikistan. Pamir Energy also projects to establish another hydropower plant of 125 kW to improve the electrification of 2000 households in Eastern Tajikistan and northern Afghanistan. The company plans to develop additional 30 hydropower sites to respond to the ever-increasing demand for electricity in the regions. Additionally, Pamir Energy projects to extend its operations to other areas in Tajikistan and Afghanistan to facilitate socio-economic development in the regions.

=== Taiwan ===
==== Solar power ====
In recent years, Taiwan is also catching up on promoting renewable energy throughout the country. According to SciTech Reports, 20% of the solar panels in the world are exported from Taiwan, making the country the second largest solar panel provider globally. Moreover, the current government has been planning on employing solar energy to public amenities and incorporate the green energy to people's daily lives. For instance, the Taipei city government has constructed 3216 solar panels to turn a former wasteland into a power house. In the southern city Tainan where there is sufficient sunshine, 5288 buildings are equipped with solar panels that can generate 7 MW, which is roughly 3.2 times the amount of the hydropower produced by the local dam. Besides mainland Taiwan, there are solar panels even on the Penghu islands that can generate 83,000 kWh/year with the newly purchased inverter.

==== Wind power ====
In addition, Taiwan's island geographic provides ideal wind power locations. Since 2000, there have been 347 wind power systems constructed, yielding a total of 684.4 MW of storage nationwide. The offshore wind power development has also been lately invested by world-renowned companies such as Ørsted, Northland Power Inc., and Copenhagen Infrastructure Partners etc. and it is anticipated that the offshore wind power would be generating 5.5 GW by 2025.

==== Thermal energy ====
Besides wind power, the volcanic formation of Taiwan also provides the country with geothermal resources. In 2015, the Bureau of Energy and the Industrial Technology Research Institute signed a MOU contract with the New Taipei City Government in order to promote Kim San Xi Huang Zi Ping's 10 MW thermal energy. Researchers at Taitung University are also working on utilizing the hot spring in the area to produce geothermal energy. The Taiwan Power Company has also initiated the Geothermal Generator Experimental Plan in Green Island by digging two experimental geothermal wells at Jhaorih Hot Springs and establishing a 200 kWe generator. The goal is to achieve 2000 kWe by 2020, and by 2025, 11 thermal wells will be finished in Yilan Lizuh, providing 8 billion kWh per year.

==== Hydropower ====
Hydropower is another crucial renewable energy in Taiwan and it is estimated that the current hydropower can provide 4500 MW. The system running is a combination of predominantly cascade, diversion and large accumulation types in order to handle the unpredictable typhoons and droughts. The mountainous landscape of Taiwan has gifted the country a better foundation for hydropower development.

==== Other power sources ====
Beyond natural resources, some tech companies invented alternative energies such as transforming pig dung into biogas power and excess wax apple wood sticks to biomass energy. The former can produce around 25 kW of power and the technology was introduced in the Discovery Channel. Furthermore, an applied physics research team at Ching Hua University also came up with extracting DNA from fish roe to obtain certain material for DNA biopolymer photonics, which can be used to as a kind of sustainable energy.

== See also ==
- American Council on Renewable Energy (ACORE)
- International Renewable Energy Agency (IRENA)
- List of energy storage projects
- List of renewable energy topics by country
- Renewable energy in the European Union
- Renewable energy in Africa
- Renewable energy in developing countries
- Renewable energy commercialization
- Renewable energy development
- Renewables Directive
- Renewable Energy Policy Network(REN21)
- Smart villages in Asia
- Solar Energy Industries Association (SEIA)
- United Nations Environment Organization
- Bayat Power
