= Wind power in Asia =

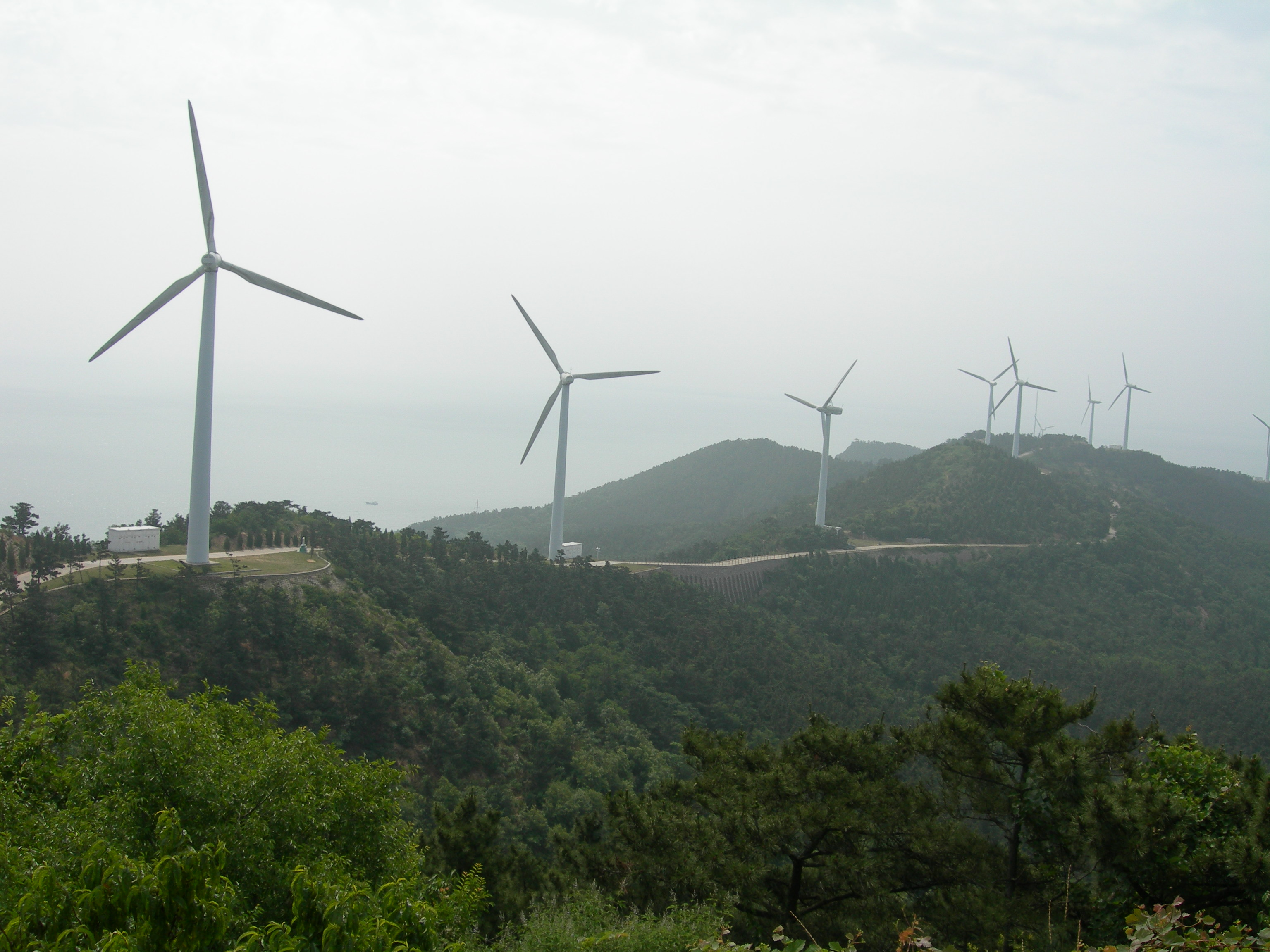
Wind farm on Changshan Islands, China

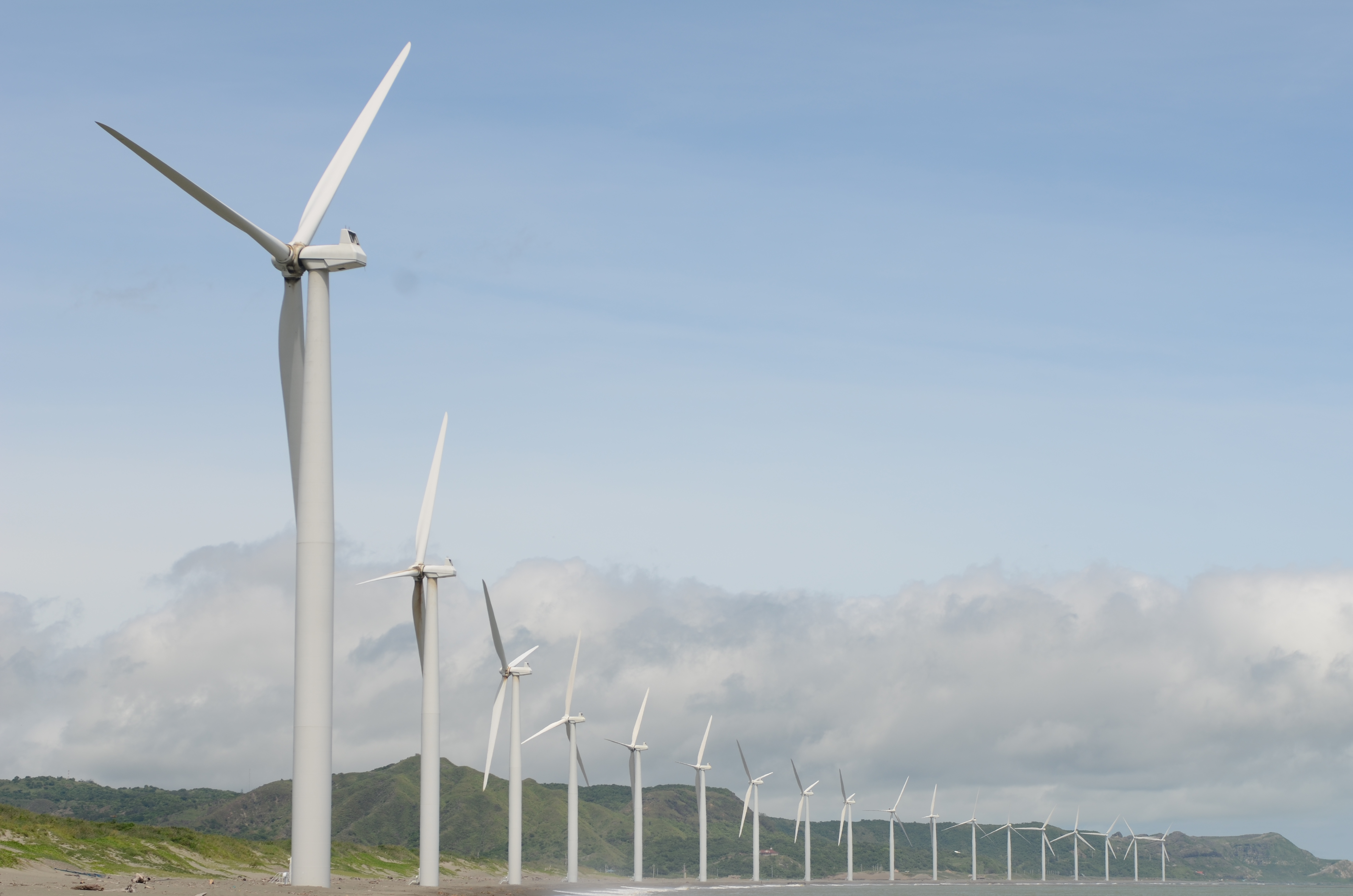
Bangui Windfarm, Philippines

Wind power in Asia is an important component in the Asian energy industry and one of the key sources of renewable energy in the region. As of 2024, the installed capacity of wind power in Asia (excluding the Middle East) totalled 1,135 GW. Asia is the fastest growing region in terms of wind energy, increased its installed capacity by a 10% yearly rate and holding 75% of the global market share. China, with 520,600 MW of installed capacity, is the world's largest generator of electricity from wind energy. India is the second largest in Asia with an installed capacity of 48,156 MW. Other key countries include Japan (5,877 MW), Vietnam (5,038 MW), Taiwan (3,037 MW), and South Korea (2,264 MW).

== Statistics ==
=== Installed wind power capacity ===
Installed capacity by countries in 2024 (MW)

- China: 520,600 MW (87.3%)
- India: 48,156 MW (8.1%)
- Japan: 5,877 MW (1.0%)
- Vietnam: 5,038 MW (0.8%)
- Taiwan: 3,905 MW (0.7%)
- South Korea: 2,264 MW (0.4%)
- Rest of Asia (excluding Middle East): 10,229 MW (1.7%)

Asia wind energy capacity (MW)
#	Nation	2024	2023	2022	2021	2020	2019	2018	2017	2016	2015	2014	2013	2012	2011	2010	2009	2008	2007	2006
1	China	520,600	441,100	365,440	327,809	288,320	236,320	211,392	188,392	168,732	145,362	114,763	91,412	75,564	62,733	44,733	25,104	12,210	5,912	2,599
2	India	48,156	44,736	41,930	40,083	38,625	37,506	35,129	32,938	28,700	25,088	22,465	20,150	18,421	16,084	13,064	10,925	9,587	7,850	6,270
3	Japan	5,877	5,214	4,804	4,575	4,373	3,857	3,661	3,399	3,234	3,038	2,789	2,669	2,614	2,501	2,304	2,056	1,880	1,528	1,309
4	Vietnam	5,038	4,799	3,976	3,976	513	388	228	197	-	-	-	-	-	-	-	-	-	-	-
5	Taiwan	3,905	2,677	1,581	1,094	937	854	713	692	682	647	637	614	571	522	475	374	250	186	102
6	South Korea	2,264	1,967	1,800	1,704	1,797	1,493	1,302	1,140	1,031	835	609	561	483	407	379	348	278	192	176
7	Pakistan	1,874	1,817	N/A	N/A	1,287	1,239	1,189	789	591	308	-	-	-	-	-	-	-	-	-
8	Kazakhstan	1,043	916	755	337	-	-	-	-	-	-	-	-	-	-	-	-	-	-	-
9	Philippines	593	593	443	443	427	427	427	427	216	216	216	66	-	-	-	-	-	-	-
10	Iran	N/A	N/A	N/A	N/A	N/A	N/A	N/A	N/A	N/A	N/A	N/A	91	91	91	91	91	82	67	47
11	Mongolia	N/A	N/A	N/A	N/A	N/A	N/A	N/A	N/A	N/A	N/A	N/A	50	-	-	-	-	-	-	-
13	Sri Lanka	N/A	N/A	N/A	N/A	N/A	N/A	N/A	N/A	N/A	N/A	N/A	63	63	-	-	-	-	-	-
14	Thailand	N/A	N/A	N/A	N/A	1,538	1,538	648	648	223	223	223	223	112	7	-	-	-	-	-
-	Rest of Asia	6,719	4,835	3,945	3,776	2,670	2,114	1,814	1,674	276	253	-	87	71	-	-	-	-	-	-
World total capacity (MW)		1,135,500	1,020,611	906,218	829,367	777,982	679,431	591,549	540,432	486,790	432,680	141,902	115,986	97,983	82,387	61,090	38,960	24,395	15,829	10,589

^{@}If data is not available for a particular year for a given country, for calculating the total the last available data is considered.

== See also ==
- Wind farm
- Wind power in India
- Wind power in Iran
- Wind power in Pakistan
- Wind power in Thailand
