= UN-Energy =

UN-Energy is an interagency mechanism within the system of the United Nations related to energy. It was created after the 2002 World Summit on Sustainable Development in Johannesburg, and its purpose is to create a coherent approach towards a sustainable energy system especially in developing countries to meet the Millennium Development Goals.

To do this, UN-Energy is reviewing energy-related activities within the UN system and trying to mainstream them into a broader approach. At present, UN-Energy remains a very small UN entity since it does not even reach the programme status.

UN-Energy was established as a subsidiary body of CEB in 2004 to help ensure coherence in the United Nations system’s multi-disciplinary response to the World Summit on Sustainable Development (WSSD) and to promote the effective engagement of non-UN stakeholders in implementing WSSD energy-related decisions. Its membership consists of senior officials and experts on energy of the commissions, organizations, funds and programmes listed below. Secretariat work is being done by the Department of Economic and Social Affairs (DESA).

Damilola Ogunbiyi, Special Representative of the UN Secretary-General for Sustainable Energy and Achim Steiner, UNDP Administrator, are the co-chairs of UN-Energy.

== Members ==
- Food and Agriculture Organization
- International Atomic Energy Agency
- Global Environment Facility
- United Nations International Research and Training Institute for the Advancement of Women
- United Nations Conference on Trade and Development
- United Nations Department of Economic and Social Affairs
- United Nations Development Programme
- United Nations Economic and Social Commission for Asia and the Pacific
- United Nations Economic and Social Commission for Western Asia
- United Nations Economic Commission for Africa
- United Nations Economic Commission for Europe
- United Nations Economic Commission for Latin America and the Caribbean
- United Nations Educational, Scientific and Cultural Organization
- United Nations Environment Programme
- United Nations Framework Convention on Climate Change
- United Nations Human Settlements Programme
- United Nations Industrial Development Organization
- United Nations System Chief Executives Board Secretariat
- World Bank Group
- World Health Organization
- World Meteorological Organization
