= Renewable thermal energy =

Storing and using heat from easily replenished natural resources

Renewable Thermal
- Type: Energy
- Working principle: Thermodynamics
- First production: 1800s

Renewable thermal energy is the technology of gathering thermal energy from a renewable energy source for immediate use or for storage in a thermal battery for later use.

The most popular form of renewable thermal energy is the sun and the solar energy is harvested by solar collectors to heat water, buildings, pools and various processes. Another example of Renewable Thermal is a Geothermal or ground source Heat Pump (GHP) system, where thermal stored in the ground from the summer is extracted from the ground to heat a building in another season. This example system is "renewable" because the source of excess heat energy is a reliably recurring process that occurs each summer season.

== History of Renewable Thermal Systems ==
Solar energy has been in use for centuries for heating dwellings and to produce hot water before low cost natural gas was discovered. It gained attention during and after the oil embargo of 1973 as engineers investigated ways to produce thermal energy from a renewable source instead of fossil fuels.

The history of utilizing the ground as a heat source is more recent and has gained prominence in recent years especially in rural areas where natural gas heating may not be available. The outer crust of the Earth is a Thermal Battery that maintains a median temperature which is the same as the average air temperature at that location. This "average ground temperature" is a combination in balance of solar gain from the sun, thermal gain from the core of the earth, and heat loss due to conduction, evaporation, and radiation. The graphic at the right shows a map of the "average ground temperature" at locations within the United States.

== Types ==
=== Solar-based Renewable Thermal ===
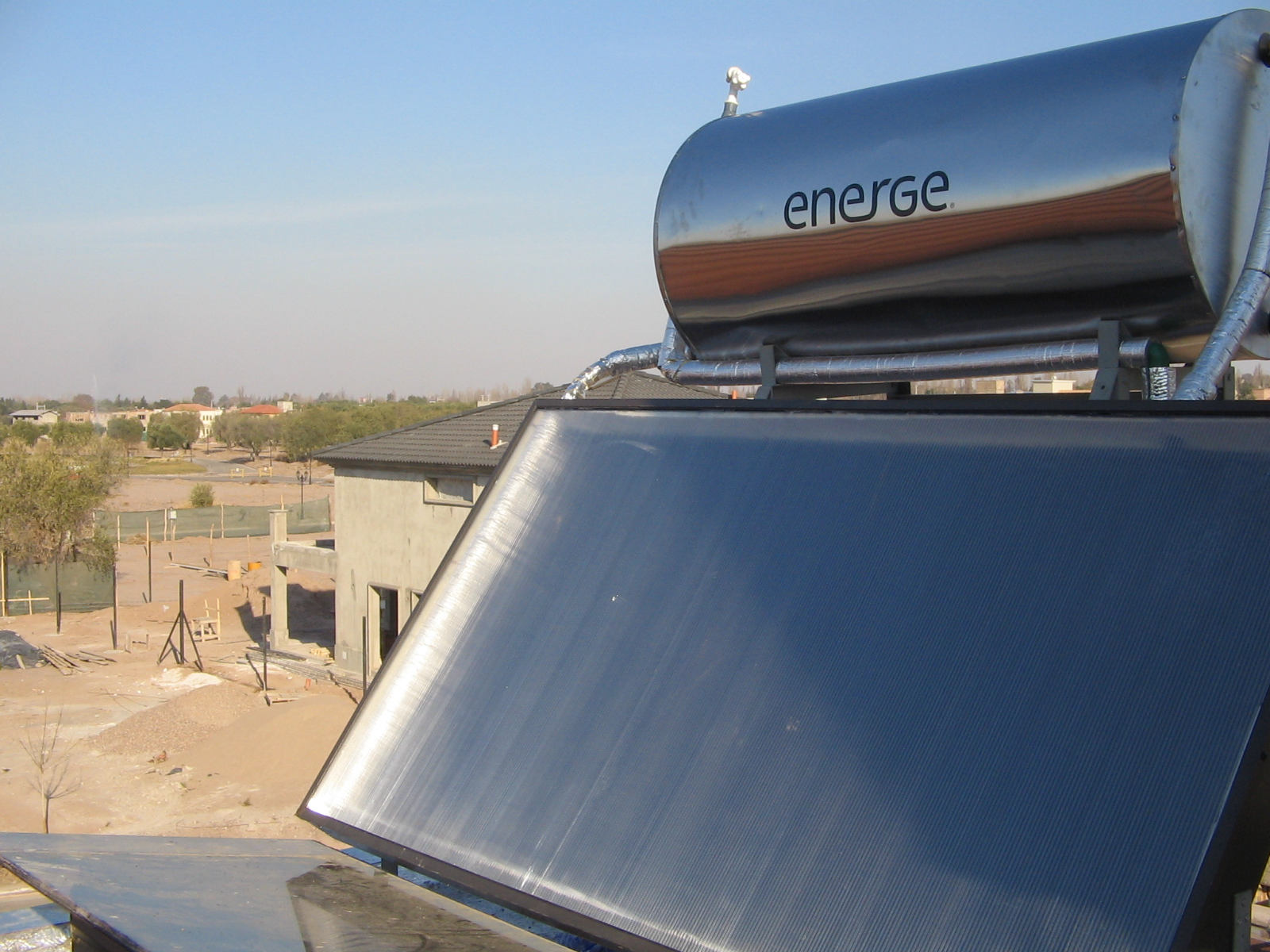
Roof-mounted close-coupled thermosiphon solar water heater.

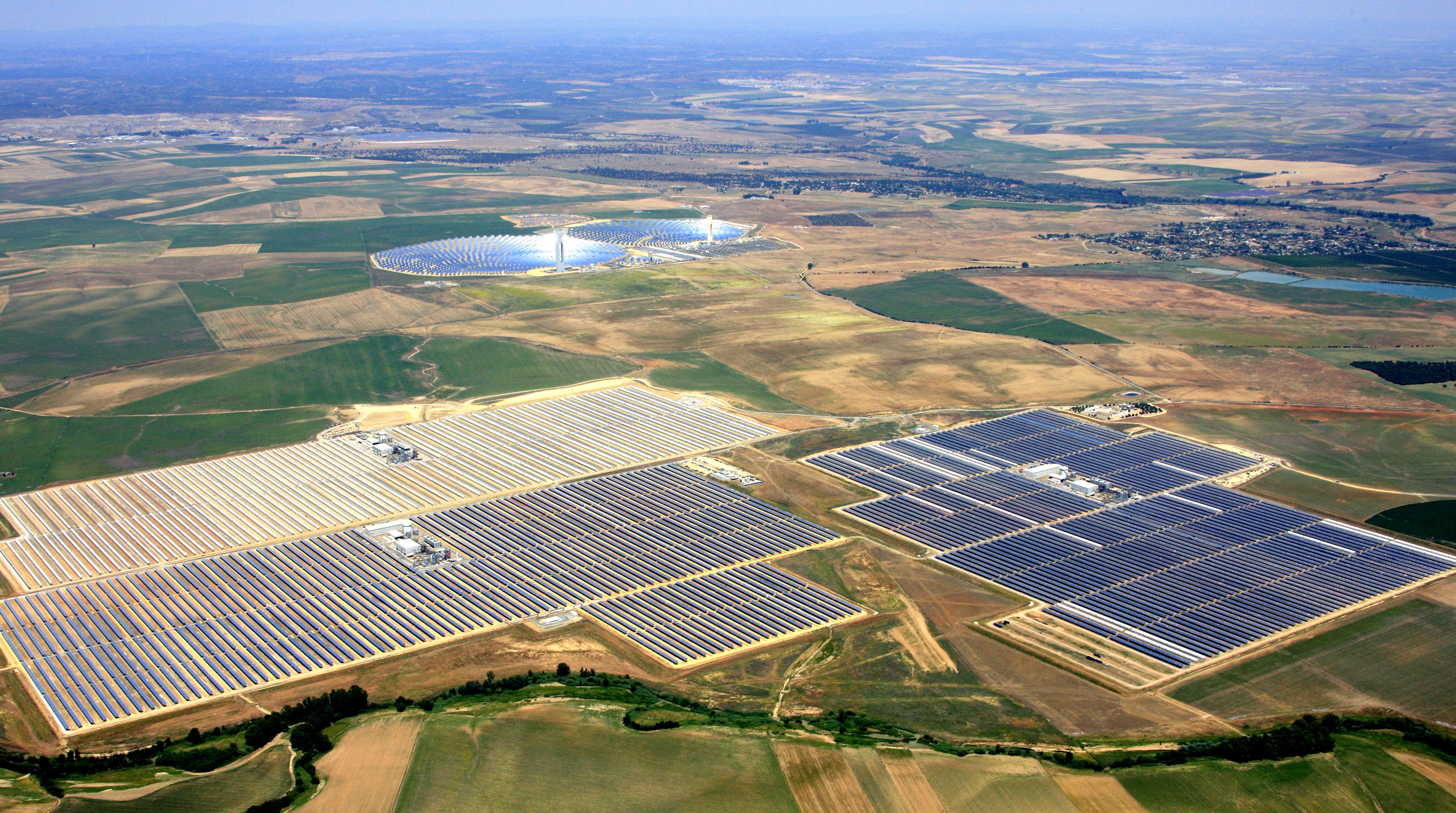
The first three units of Solnova in the foreground, with the two towers of the PS10 and PS20 solar power stations in the background.

Solar thermal energy (STE) is a form of energy and a technology for harnessing solar energy to generate thermal energy for use in industry, and in the residential and commercial sectors. Solar thermal collectors are classified by the United States Energy Information Administration as low-, medium-, or high-temperature collectors. Low-temperature collectors are generally unglazed and used to heat swimming pools or to heat ventilation air. Medium-temperature collectors are also usually flat plates but are used for heating water or air for residential and commercial use.

High-temperature collectors concentrate sunlight using mirrors or lenses and are generally used for fulfilling heat requirements up to 300 °C (600 °F) / 20 bar (300 psi) pressure in industries, and for electric power production. Two categories include Concentrated Solar Thermal (CST) for fulfilling heat requirements in industries, and concentrated solar power (CSP) when the heat collected is used for electric power generation. CST and CSP are not replaceable in terms of application.

Unlike photovoltaic cells that convert sunlight directly into electricity, solar thermal systems convert it into heat. They use mirrors or lenses to concentrate sunlight onto a receiver, which in turn heats a water reservoir. The heated water can then be used in homes. The advantage of solar thermal is that the heated water can be stored until it is needed, eliminating the need for a separate energy storage system. Solar thermal power can also be converted to electricity by using the steam generated from the heated water to drive a turbine connected to a generator. However, because generating electricity this way is much more expensive than photovoltaic power plants, there are very few in use today.

=== Ground-based Renewable Thermal ===
A qanat and windcatcher used as an earth duct, for both earth coupling and evaporative cooling. No fan is needed; the suction in the lee of the windtower draws the air up and out.

A ground-coupled heat exchanger is an underground heat exchanger that can capture heat from and/or dissipate heat to the ground. They use the Earth's near constant subterranean temperature to warm or cool air or other fluids for residential, agricultural or industrial uses. If building air is blown through the heat exchanger for heat recovery ventilation, they are called earth tubes (or Canadian well, Provençal well, Solar chimney, also termed earth cooling tubes, earth warming tubes, earth-air heat exchangers (EAHE or EAHX), air-to-soil heat exchanger, earth channels, earth canals, earth-air tunnel systems, ground tube heat exchanger, hypocausts, subsoil heat exchangers, thermal labyrinths, underground air pipes, and others).

Earth tubes are often a viable and economical alternative or supplement to conventional central heating or air conditioning systems since there are no compressors, chemicals or burners and only blowers are required to move the air. These are used for either partial or full cooling and/or heating of facility ventilation air. Their use can help buildings meet Passive House standards or LEED certification.

Earth-air heat exchangers have been used in agricultural facilities (animal buildings) and horticultural facilities (greenhouses) in the United States of America over the past several decades and have been used in conjunction with solar chimneys in hot arid areas for thousands of years, probably beginning in the Persian Empire. Implementation of these systems in India as well as in the cooler climates of Austria, Denmark and Germany to preheat the air for home ventilation systems has become fairly common since the mid-1990s, and is slowly being adopted in North America.

Ground-coupled heat exchanger may also use water or antifreeze as a heat transfer fluid, often in conjunction with a geothermal heat pump. See, for example downhole heat exchangers. The rest of this article deals primarily with earth-air heat exchangers or earth tubes.

=== Season thermal energy storage ===
Seasonal thermal energy storage (STES), also known as inter-seasonal thermal energy storage, is the storage of heat or cold for periods of up to several months. The thermal energy can be collected whenever it is available and be used whenever needed, such as in the opposing season. For example, heat from solar collectors or waste heat from air conditioning equipment can be gathered in hot months for space heating use when needed, including during winter months. Waste heat from industrial process can similarly be stored and be used much later or the natural cold of winter air can be stored for summertime air conditioning.

STES stores can serve district heating systems, as well as single buildings or complexes. Among seasonal storages used for heating, the design peak annual temperatures generally are in the range of 27 to 80 °C (81 to 180 °F), and the temperature difference occurring in the storage over the course of a year can be several tens of degrees. Some systems use a heat pump to help charge and discharge the storage during part or all of the cycle. For cooling applications, often only circulation pumps are used.

Sorption and thermochemical heat storage are considered the most suitable for seasonal storage due to the theoretical absence of heat loss between charging and discharging. However, studies have shown that actual heat losses currently are usually significant.

Examples for district heating include Drake Landing Solar Community where ground storage provides 97% of yearly consumption without heat pumps,

and Danish pond storage with boosting.

== Policy by geography ==
=== New York State ===
The state of New York took a big step in September 2015 when it created a new office titled Director of Renewable Thermal. The NY Director of Renewable Thermal will oversee a team to help companies develop and implement renewable, low-carbon cooling and heating systems. NY State considers this initiative a critical component of NYSERDA's strategy to enable net-zero energy buildings, which produce the same amount of energy as they consume. It also will further advance New York's progress toward creating self-sustaining energy markets for clean, renewable technologies.

Renewable Thermal has been a core resource in many states Renewable Portfolio Standards. The report says: "State Renewable Portfolio Standard (RPS) programs have historically focused on electricity generation. However, some states have started incorporating renewable thermal power for heat generation into their RPS as a way to support the development and market growth of solar thermal, biomass thermal, geothermal, and other renewable thermal technologies." The plan focuses on "Renewable thermal energy has many of the same benefits as other renewable technologies, including improved air quality, economic development and job creation, and the promotion of regional energy security." An industry public described on-site combustion as :responsible for 35 percent of fossil fuel greenhouse gas emissions in New York State. "

== See also ==
- Thermal energy storage
- Seasonal thermal energy storage system
- Solar air heat
- Geothermal heat pump
