= Consumer green energy program =

Program that enables households to buy energy from renewable sources

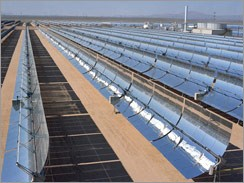
A solar trough array is an example of green energy.

A consumer green energy program is a program that enables households to buy energy from renewable sources. By allowing consumers to purchase renewable energy, it simultaneously diverts the utilization of fossil fuels and promotes the use of renewable energy sources such as solar and wind.

In several countries with common carrier arrangements, electricity retailing arrangements make it possible for consumers to purchase "green" electricity from either their utility or a green power provider. Electricity is considered to be green if it is produced from a source that produces relatively little pollution, and the concept is often considered equivalent to renewable energy. Although electricity is the most common green energy, biomethane is sold as "green gas" in some locations.

In many countries, green energy currently provides a very small amount of electricity, generally contributing less than 2 to 5% to the overall pool of electricity offered by most utility companies, electric companies, or state power pools. In some U.S. states, local governments have formed regional power purchasing pools using Community Choice Aggregation and Solar Bonds to achieve a 51% renewable mix or higher, such as in the City of San Francisco.

By participating in a green energy program a consumer may be having an effect on the energy sources used and ultimately might be helping to promote and expand the use of green energy. They are also making a statement to policy makers that they are willing to pay a price premium to support renewable energy. Green energy consumers either obligate the utility companies to increase the amount of green energy that they purchase from the pool (so decreasing the amount of non-green energy they purchase), or directly fund the green energy through a green power provider. If insufficient green energy sources are available, the utility must develop new ones or contract with a third party energy supplier to provide green energy, causing more to be built. However, there is no way the consumer can check whether or not the electricity bought is "green" or otherwise.

In some countries such as the Netherlands, electricity companies guarantee to buy an equal amount of 'green power' as is being used by their green power customers. The Dutch government exempts green power from pollution taxes, which means green power is hardly any more expensive than other power.

== Green energy and labeling by region ==
=== European Union ===
Directive 2004/8/EC of the European Parliament and of the Council of 11 February 2004 on the promotion of cogeneration based on a useful heat demand in the internal energy market includes the article 5 (Guarantee of origin of electricity from high-efficiency cogeneration).

European environmental NGOs have launched an ecolabel for green power. The ecolabel is called EKOenergy. It sets criteria for sustainability, additionality, consumer information and tracking. Only part of electricity produced by renewables fulfills the EKOenergy criteria.

=== United Kingdom ===
The Green Energy Supply Certification Scheme was launched in 2010: it implements guidelines from the Energy Regulator, Ofgem, and sets requirements on transparency, the matching of sales by renewable energy supplies, and additionality. Green electricity in the United Kingdom is widespread, and green gas is supplied to over a million homes.

=== United States ===
The United States Department of Energy (DOE), the Environmental Protection Agency (EPA), and the Center for Resource Solutions (CRS) recognizes the voluntary purchase of electricity from renewable energy sources (also called renewable electricity or green electricity) as green power.

The most popular way to purchase renewable energy as revealed by NREL data is through purchasing Renewable Energy Certificates (RECs). According to a Natural Marketing Institute (NMI) survey 55 percent of American consumers want companies to increase their use of renewable energy.

DOE selected six companies for its 2007 Green Power Supplier Awards, including Constellation NewEnergy; 3Degrees; Sterling Planet; SunEdison; Pacific Power and Rocky Mountain Power; and Silicon Valley Power. The combined green power provided by those six winners equals more than 5 billion kilowatt-hours per year, which is enough to power nearly 465,000 average U.S. households. In 2014, Arcadia Power made RECS available to homes and businesses in all 50 states, allowing consumers to use "100% green power" as defined by the EPA's Green Power Partnership.

The U.S. Environmental Protection Agency (USEPA) Green Power Partnership is a voluntary program that supports the organizational procurement of renewable electricity by offering expert advice, technical support, tools and resources. This can help organizations lower the transaction costs of buying renewable power, reduce carbon footprint, and communicate its leadership to key stakeholders.

Throughout the country, more than half of all U.S. electricity customers now have an option to purchase some type of green power product from a retail electricity provider. Roughly one-quarter of the nation's utilities offer green power programs to customers, and voluntary retail sales of renewable energy in the United States totaled more than 12 billion kilowatt-hours in 2006, a 40% increase over the previous year.

In the United States, one of the main problems with purchasing green energy through the electrical grid is the current centralized infrastructure that supplies the consumer's electricity. This infrastructure has led to increasingly frequent brown outs and black outs, high CO_{2} emissions, higher energy costs, and power quality issues. An additional $450 billion will be invested to expand this fledgling system over the next 20 years to meet increasing demand. In addition, this centralized system is now being further overtaxed with the incorporation of renewable energies such as wind, solar, and geothermal energies. Renewable resources, due to the amount of space they require, are often located in remote areas where there is a lower energy demand. The current infrastructure would make transporting this energy to high demand areas, such as urban centers, highly inefficient and in some cases impossible. In addition, despite the amount of renewable energy produced or the economic viability of such technologies only about 20 percent will be able to be incorporated into the grid. To have a more sustainable energy profile, the United States must move towards implementing changes to the electrical grid that will accommodate a mixed-fuel economy.

Several initiatives are being proposed to mitigate distribution problems. First and foremost, the most effective way to reduce USA's CO_{2} emissions and slow global warming is through conservation efforts. Opponents of the current US electrical grid have also advocated for decentralizing the grid. This system would increase efficiency by reducing the amount of energy lost in transmission. It would also be economically viable as it would reduce the amount of power lines that will need to be constructed in the future to keep up with demand. Merging heat and power in this system would create added benefits and help to increase its efficiency by up to 80-90%. This is a significant increase from the current fossil fuel plants which only have an efficiency of 34%.

=== Asia ===
==== India ====
India's Ministry of Power notified 'Green Energy Open Access' Rules to accelerate ambitious renewable energy programmes by enabling provisions to incentivize the common consumers to get Green Power at reasonable rates through Electricity (Promoting Renewable Energy Through Green Energy Open Access) Rules, 2022 on 06.06.2022

== Small-scale green energy systems ==
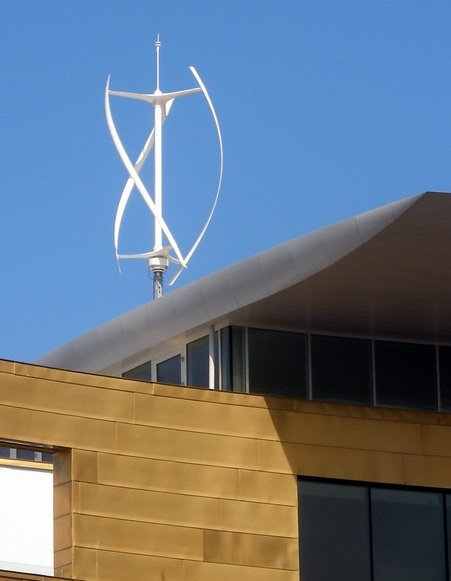
A small Quietrevolution QR5 Gorlov type vertical axis wind turbine in Bristol, England. Measuring 3 m in diameter and 5 m high, it has a nameplate rating of 6.5 kW to the grid.

Those not satisfied with the third-party grid approach to green energy via the power grid can install their own locally based renewable energy system. Renewable energy electrical systems from solar to wind to even local hydro-power in some cases, are some of the many types of renewable energy systems available locally. Additionally, for those interested in heating and cooling their dwelling via renewable energy, geothermal heat pump systems that tap the constant temperature of the earth, which is around 7 to 15 degrees Celsius a few feet underground and increases dramatically at greater depths, are an option over conventional natural gas and petroleum-fueled heat approaches. Also, in geographic locations where the Earth's Crust is especially thin, or near volcanoes (as is the case in Iceland) there exists the potential to generate even more electricity than would be possible at other sites, thanks to a more significant temperature gradient at these locales.

The advantage of this approach in the United States is that many states offer incentives to offset the cost of installation of a renewable energy system. In California, Massachusetts and several other U.S. states, a new approach to community energy supply called Community Choice Aggregation has provided communities with the means to solicit a competitive electricity supplier and use municipal revenue bonds to finance development of local green energy resources. Individuals are usually assured that the electricity they are using is actually produced from a green energy source that they control. Once the system is paid for, the owner of a renewable energy system will be producing their own renewable electricity for essentially no cost and can sell the excess to the local utility at a profit.

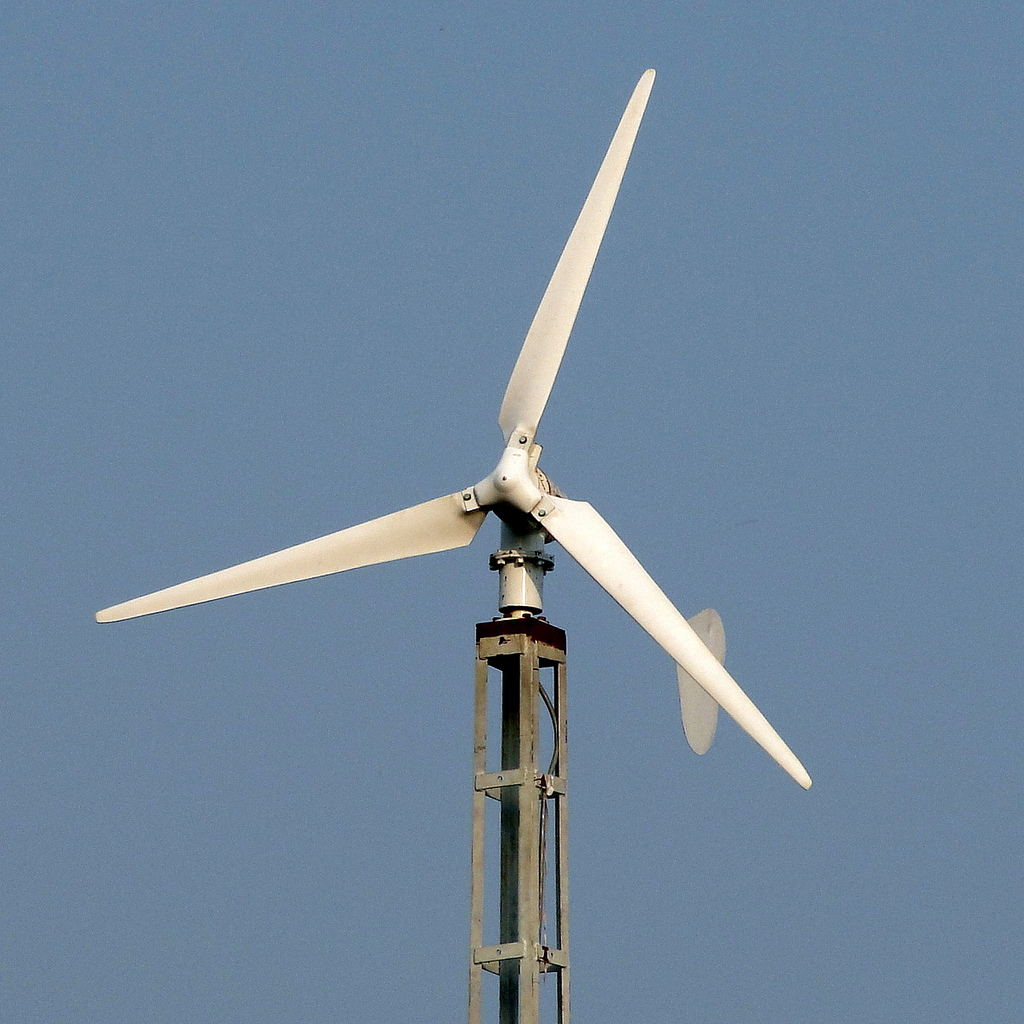
A 01 KiloWatt Micro Windmill for Domestic Usage

In household power systems, organic matter such as cow dung and spoilable organic matter can be converted to biochar. To eliminate emissions, carbon capture and storage is then used.
