= Piezoelectric resonator =

== Piezoelectric resonator (disambiguation) ==
A piezoelectric resonator is an electronic component designed for electronic oscillators and filters.

Piezoelectric resonators are:

- crystal resonators, see Crystal oscillator
- polycrystalline resonators, see Ceramic resonator
- MEMS oscillators

== See also ==
- Clock generator
- Electronic oscillator
