= Olkaria VII Geothermal Power Station =

Geothermal power station in Kenya

- Location of Olkaria VII Geothermal Power Station
- Country: Kenya
- Location: Hell's Gate National Park
- Coordinates: 00°55′49″S 36°20′02″E
- Status: Proposed
- Construction began: 2024 Expected
- Commission date: 2027 Expected
- Owner: Kengen

Power generation
- Nameplate capacity: 80.3 megawatts (107,700 hp)

The Olkaria VII Geothermal Power Station, also known as the Olkaria VII Geothermal Power Plant, is a proposed geothermal power station in Kenya. The feasibility studies which will inform the design and generation capacity of this renewable energy infrastructure is ongoing, as of March 2022. The proposed generation capacity ranges from 83 megawatts, to 140 megawatts. The plant is owned and under development by Kenya Electricity Generating Company (KenGen), the electricity generation parastatal company in Kenya.

== Location ==
The power station would be located in the Olkaria area, in Hell's Gate National Park, in Nakuru County, approximately 126 kilometres (78 mi), by road, northwest of the city of Nairobi, the capital of Kenya. After exploring seven possible locations, KenGen settled on a location 220 metres (720 ft) from the southern boundary of Hell's Gate National Park.

== Overview ==
In 2020 Kenya had total installed generation capacity of 2,840 megawatts. Of that, 863.1 megawatts (30.4 percent), were derived from geothermal sources. Olkaria VII helps the country increase its generation capacity to 5,000MW by 2030 and also increases the geothermal content towards the 50 percent goal by ethe same date.

In August 2024, in regulatory filings to the National Environment Management Authority (NEMA), following environmental and social impact studies carried out by West Japan Engineering Consultants Inc, KenGen decided to build a power plant with generation capacity of 80.3 megawatts.

== Developers ==
Olkaria VII is under development by the Kenyan parastatal, KenGen, who owns the project.

== Cost ==
The construction of this renewable energy infrastructure project is reported as KSh32 billion (approx. US$247,511,000).

== See also ==
- List of power stations in Kenya
- Geothermal power in Kenya
- Olkaria I Geothermal Power Station
- Olkaria II Geothermal Power Station
- Olkaria III Geothermal Power Station
- Olkaria IV Geothermal Power Station
- Olkaria V Geothermal Power Station
