= Olkaria VI Geothermal Power Station =

Kenyan geothermal power station

- Location of Olkaria VI Geothermal Power Station
- Country: Kenya
- Location: Hell's Gate National Park
- Coordinates: 00°51′43″S 36°18′52″E
- Status: Operational
- Construction began: 2022 Expected
- Commission date: 2024 Expected
- Owner: Kengen

Power generation
- Units operational: 2 x 70MW
- Nameplate capacity: 140 megawatts (190,000 hp)

The Olkaria VI Geothermal Power Station, also known as the Olkaria VI Geothermal Power Plant, is a power station under construction in Kenya, with an electric capacity of 140 megawatts. The plant will be developed under a public private partnership (PPP) model, where the state-owned Kenya Electricity Generating Company (KenGen) will co-own the power station with a strategic partner.

== Location ==
The power station would be located in the Olkaria area, in Hell's Gate National Park, in Nakuru County, approximately 120 kilometres (75 mi), by road, northwest of the city of Nairobi, the capital of Kenya. Olkaria VI would sit adjacent to Olkaria II Geothermal Power Station.

== Overview ==
The Olkaria VI power station is designed to generate 140 MW, to be sold directly to Kenya Power and Lighting Company (KenyaPower), for integration into the Kenyan grid. About 3.75 kilometres (2 mi) from the site of Olkaria VI, lies a 220kV substation, where the output from this power station will be directed for evacuation.

KenGen has drilled and tested steam holes and prepared the site where the power station will be built. When a strategic partner is identified and selected, an ad hoc special purpose vehicle (SPV) company will be formed, with KenGen owning 25 percent of the SPV.

== Developers ==
In May 2020, KenGen concluded the first bidding round for the selection of the strategic partner. Four companies and one consortium were selected to proceed to the second round of bidding. The five entities are listed in the table below.

Winners of First Round of Bidding to Develop Olkaria VI Geothermal Power Station
| Rank | IPP/Developer | Domicile | Notes |
|---|---|---|---|
| 1 | Ormat Technologies | United States | |
| 2 | Itochu Corporation | Japan | |
| 3 | Sumitomo Corporation | Japan | |
| 4 | Enel Green Power | Italy | |
| 5 | Engie/Toyota Consortium* | United Kingdom/Japan | |

- Notes: The Engie/Toyota Consortium comprises (a) Engie Energy Services of the United Kingdom (b) Toyota Tsusho Corporation of Japan (c) Kyuden International Corporation and (d) DL Koisagat Tea Estate.

== Operations ==
The plan calls for the strategic partner to own, finance, build, operate and maintain the power station for the duration of the PPP contract. At the end of that contract, ownership would revert to KenGen. During the contract period, KenGen would be responsible for supplying the steam required to run the power station.

== See also ==
- List of power stations in Kenya
- Geothermal power in Kenya
- Olkaria I Geothermal Power Station
- Olkaria II Geothermal Power Station
- Olkaria III Geothermal Power Station
- Olkaria IV Geothermal Power Station
- Olkaria V Geothermal Power Station
