= Renewable energy in Africa =

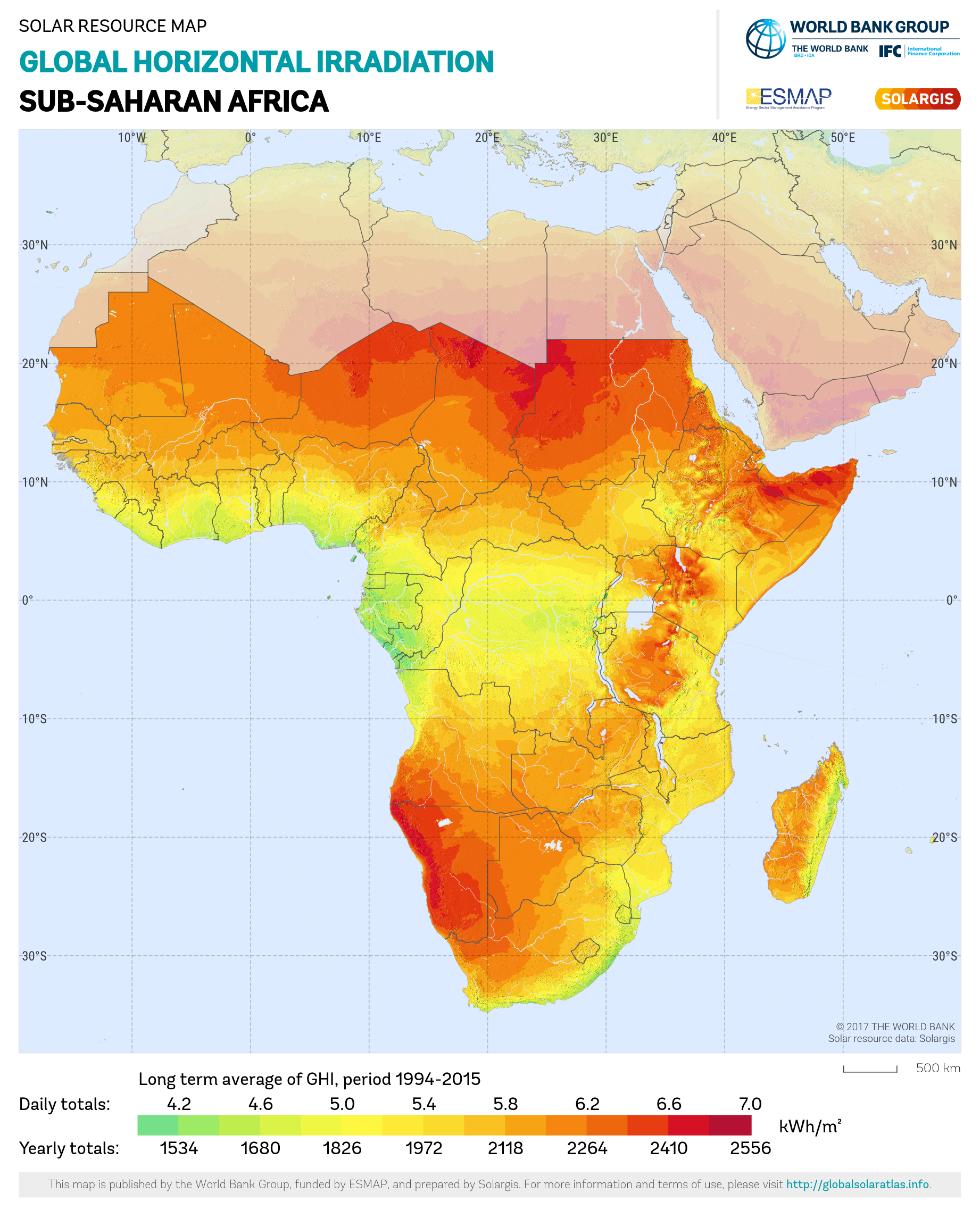
Global Horizontal Irradiation in Sub-Saharan Africa.

The developing nations of Africa are popular locations for the application of renewable energy technology. Currently, many nations already have small-scale solar, wind, and geothermal devices in operation providing energy to urban and rural populations. These types of energy production are especially useful in remote locations because of the excessive cost of transporting electricity from large-scale power plants. The applications of renewable energy technology has the potential to alleviate many of the problems that face Africans every day, especially if done in a sustainable manner that prioritizes human rights.

Access to energy is essential for the reduction of poverty and promotion of economic growth. Communication technologies, education, industrialization, agricultural improvement and expansion of municipal water systems all require abundant, reliable, and cost-effective energy access.

== Avoiding fossil fuels ==
By investing in the long-term energy solutions that alternative energy sources afford, most African nations would benefit significantly in the longer term by avoiding the pending economic problems developed countries are currently facing.

Although in many ways fossil fuels provide a simple, easy to use energy source that powered the industrialization of most modern nations, the issues associated with the widespread use of fossil fuels are now numerous, consisting of some of the world's most difficult and large-scale global political, economic, health and environmental problems. The looming energy crisis results from consuming these fossil fuels at a rate which is unsustainable, with the global demand for fossil fuels expected to increase every year for the next several decades, compounding existing problems.

While a great number of projects are currently underway to expand and connect the existing grid networks, too many problems exist to make this a realistic option for the vast majority of people in Africa, especially those who live in rural locations. Distributed generation using renewable energy systems is the only practical solution to meet rural electrification needs. There is a move towards energy decentralization in African nations, with many looking towards variants of energy decentralization frameworks, such as District Energy Officers, for example as described in a recommendations paper for District Energy Officers for the country of Malawi.

== Renewable energy resources ==
Hydroelectric, wind and solar power all derive their energy from the Sun. The Sun emits more energy in one second (3.827 × 10^{26} J) than is available in all of the fossil fuels present on earth (3.9 × 10^{22} J), and therefore has the potential to provide all of our current and future global energy requirements. Since solar energy production has no direct emissions and does not require refueling, African nations can protect their people, their environment, and their future economic development by using renewable energy sources To this end they have a number of possible options. There has been a collaborative effort across Africa to support the development of renewable energy through the Africa Renewable Energy Initiative (AREI).

=== Solar resources ===
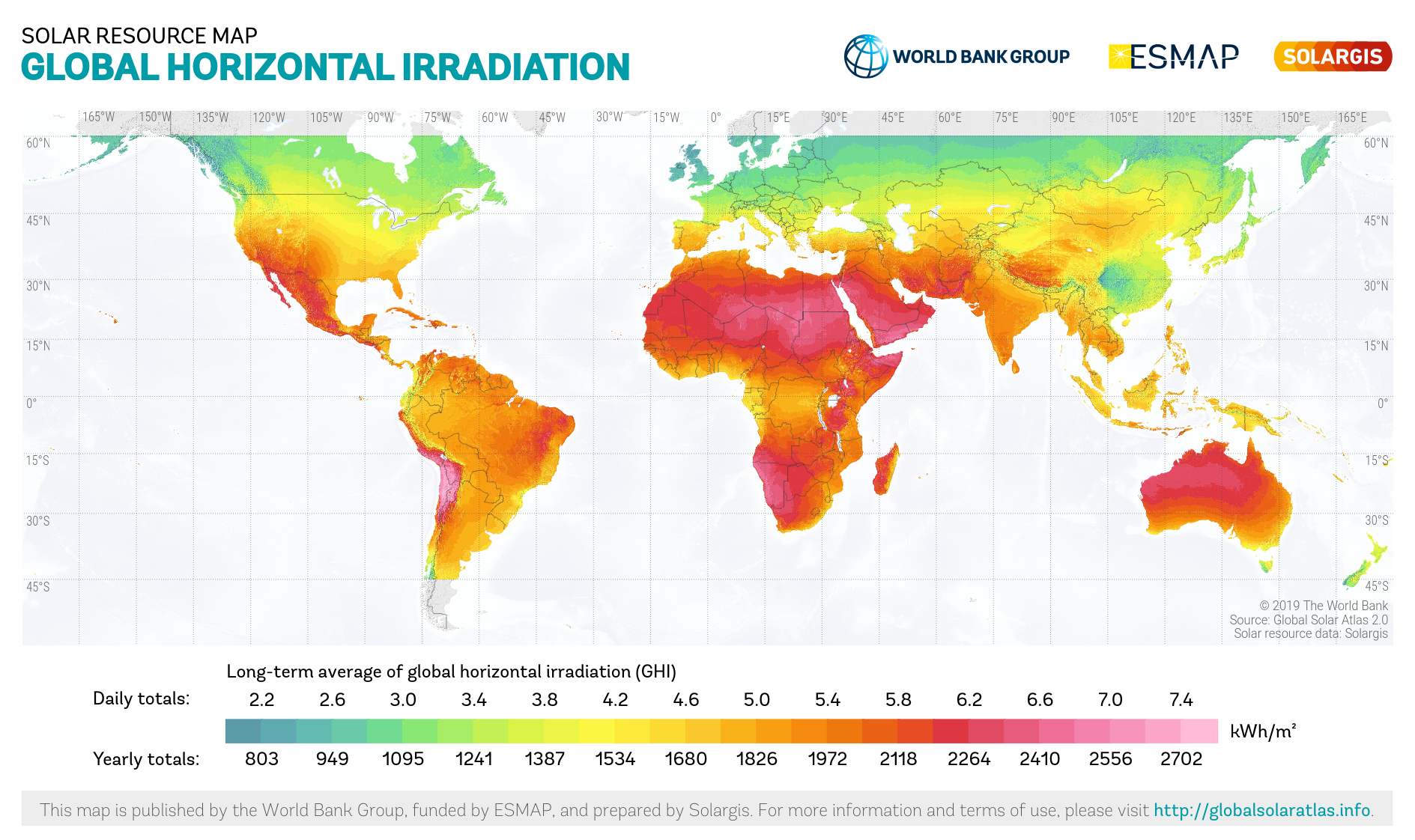
World map of global solar horizontal irradiation

Africa receives the most sunlight in comparison to all the other continents on Earth, especially as there are many perpetually sunny areas like the huge Sahara Desert.

It has much greater solar resources than any other continent. Desert regions stand out as having the most sunlight, while rainforests are considerably cloudier but still get a good global solar irradiation because of the proximity to the equator.

The distribution of solar resources across Africa is fairly uniform, with more than 85% of the continent's landscape receiving at least 2,000 kWh/(m^{2} year). A recent study indicates that a solar generating facility covering just 0.3% of the area comprising North Africa could supply all of the energy required by the European Union. This is the same land area as the state of Maine.

The Ouarzazate solar power plant was completed in 2016 in Morocco.

=== Wave and wind resources ===
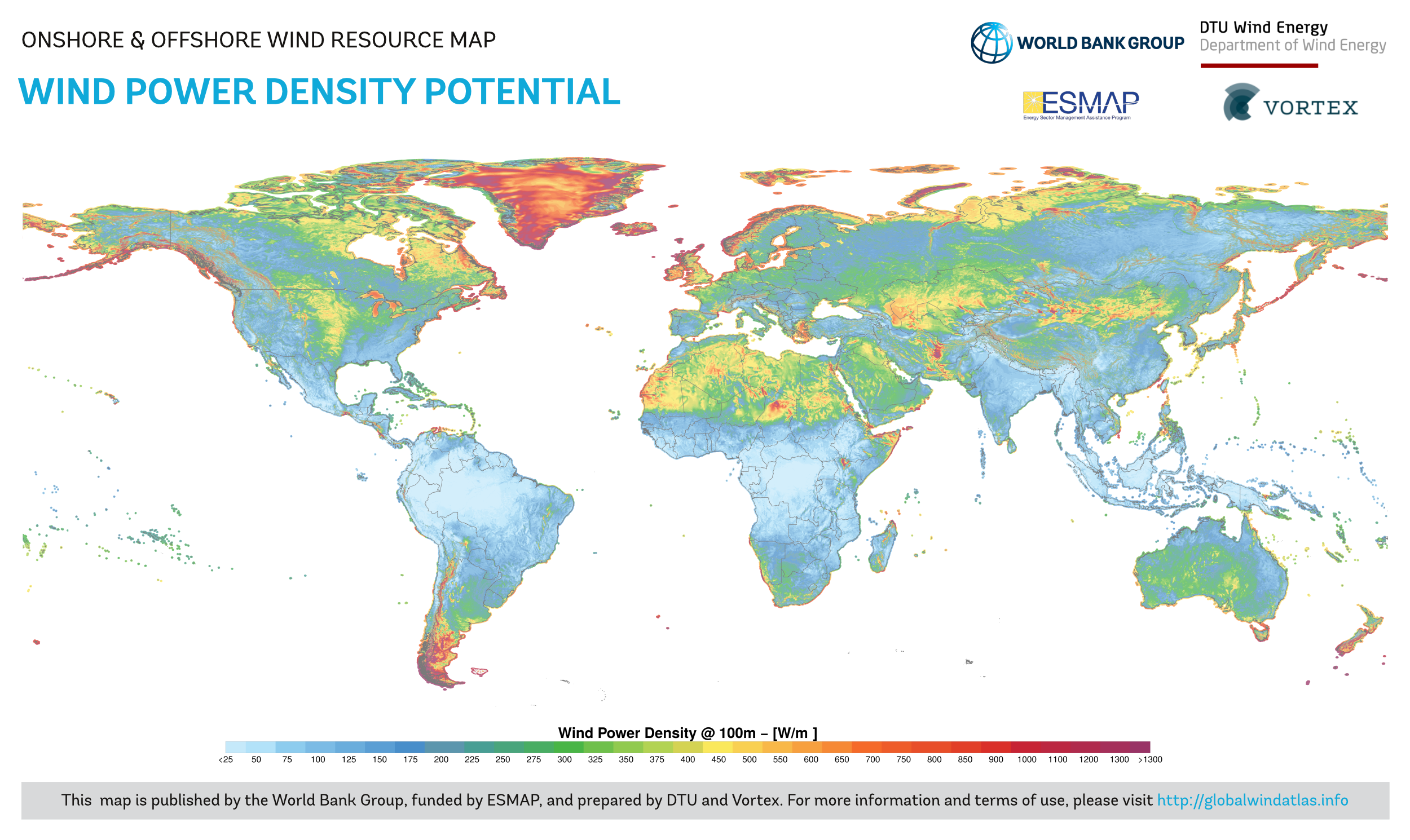
World map of wind power density.

Africa has a large coastline, where wind power and wave power resources are abundant and underutilized in the north and south. Geothermal power has the potential to provide considerable amounts of energy in many eastern African nations.

Wind is far less uniformly distributed than solar resources, with optimal locations positioned near special topographical funneling features close to coastal locations, mountain ranges, and other natural channels in the north and south. The availability of wind on the western coast of Africa is substantial, exceeding 3,750 kW·h, and will accommodate the future prospect for energy demands Central Africa has lower than average wind resources to work with.

=== Geothermal resources ===
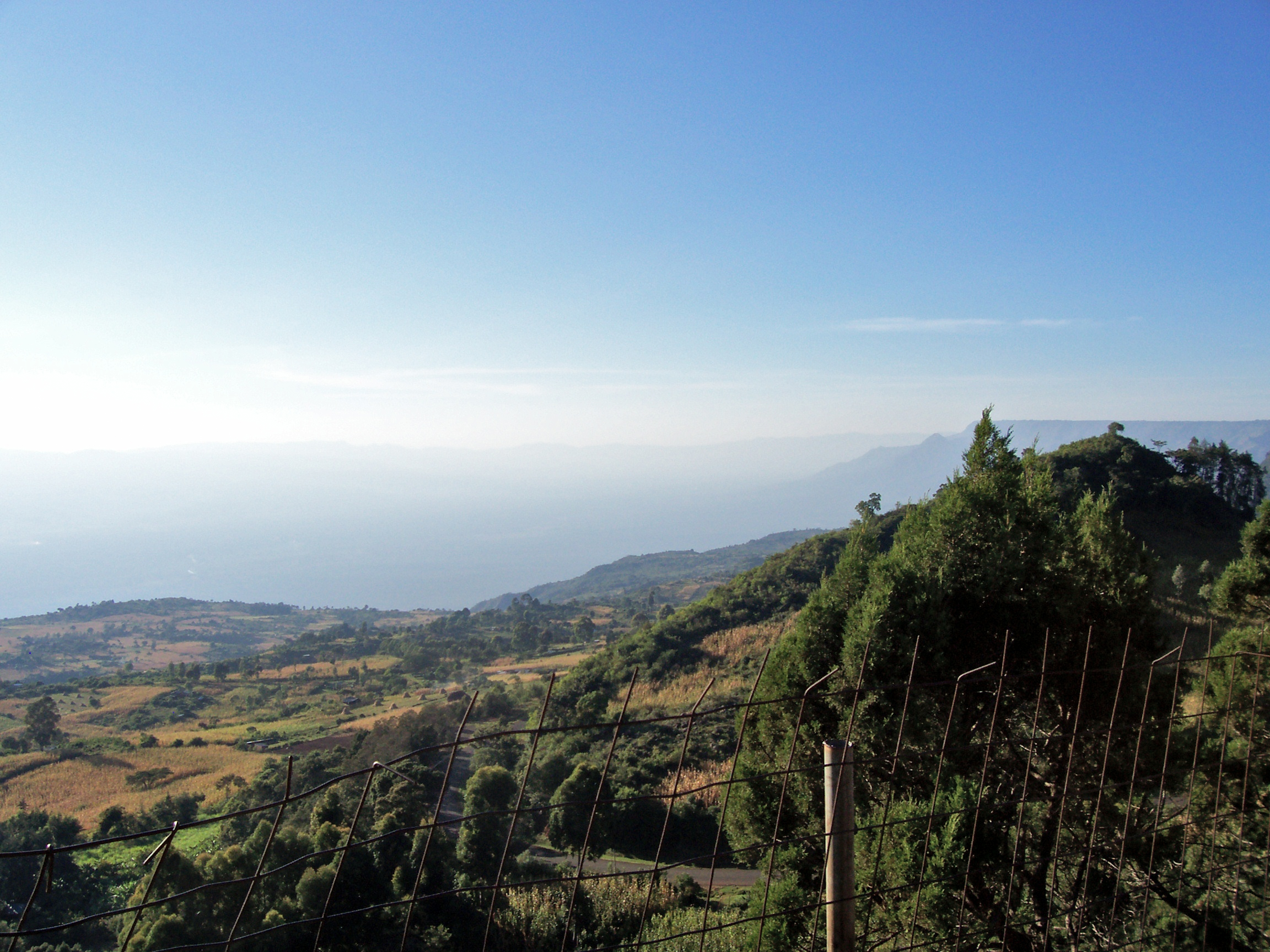
The Rift Valley near Eldoret, Kenya

Geothermal power is mostly concentrated in eastern Africa, but there are many fragmented spots of high-intensity geothermal potential spread across the continent. There is enormous potential for geothermal energy in the East African Rift which is roughly 5,900 kilometers in length and spans several countries in East Africa including Eritrea, Ethiopia, Djibouti, Kenya, Uganda, and Zambia.

=== Biomass ===
Unsustainable use of biomass fuels endangers biodiversity and risks further damage or destruction to the landscape. 86% of Africa's biomass energy is used in the sub-Saharan region, excluding South Africa. Even where other forms of energy are available, it is not harnessed and utilized efficiently, underscoring the need to promote energy efficiency where energy access is available.

Biomass obtained in Africa is mainly used for energy through burning, however, there is an urgent need to address the current levels of respiratory illness from burning biomass in homes. Taking into consideration the cost differential between biomass and fossil fuels, it is far more cost-effective to improve the technology used to burn the biomass than to use fossil fuels. Technologies such as gasification and anaerobic digestion systems are some of the popular systems used to convert biomass fuels to cleaner energy.

=== Horizontal integration potential ===
Solar and wind power are extremely scalable, as there are systems available from less than 1 watt to several megawatts. This makes it possible to initialize the electrification of a home or village with minimal initial capital. It also allows for dynamic and incremental scaling as load demands increases. The component configuration of a wind or solar installation also provides a level of functional redundancy, improving the reliability of the system. If a single panel in a multi-panel solar array is damaged, the rest of the system continues functioning unimpeded. In a similar way, the failure of a single wind tower in a multi-tower configuration does not cause a system-level failure.

Because solar and wind projects produce power where it is used, they provide a safe, reliable and cost-effective solution. Because transmission equipment is avoided, these systems are more secure and less vulnerable to attack. This can be an important feature in regions prone to conflict. Wind and solar power systems are simple to set up, easy to operate, easy to repair, and durable. Wind resources and solar resources are abundant enough to provide all of the electrical energy requirements of rural populations, and this can be done in remote and otherwise fragmented low-density areas that are impractical to address using conventional grid-based systems.

== Finance ==
Photovoltaic panels, wind turbines, deep cycle batteries, meters, sockets, cables, and connectors are all expensive. Even when the relative difference in buying power, materials cost, opportunity cost, labor cost and overhead is factored in, renewable energy will remain expensive for people who are living on less than US$1 per day. Many rural electrification projects in the past use government subsidies to finance the implementation of rural development programs. It is difficult for rural electrification projects to be accomplished by for-profit companies; in economically impoverished areas these programs must be run at a loss for reasons of practicality. There are several theorized ways in which specific African nations can rally the resources for such projects.

=== Potential funding sources ===
European countries that consume oil refined from African countries have the opportunity to subsidize the costs of individual level, village level, or community level alternative energy systems through emissions trading credits. It has been proposed that for every unit of African origin carbon consumed by the European market, a predetermined amount of green credits or carbon credits would be yielded. The European partners could then either supply parts, components, or systems directly, an equivalent amount of investment capital, or lend credits to finance the distribution of renewable energy services, knowledge or equipment.

International relief targeted at poverty reduction could also be redirected towards subsidizing renewable energy projects. Because of the integral role that electrification plays in supporting economic and social development, funding of rural electrification can be seen as the core method for addressing poverty. Radios, televisions, telephones, computer networks, and computers all rely on access to electricity. Because information services allow for the proliferation of education resources, funding the electric backbone to such systems has a derivative effect on their development. In this way, access to communications and education plays a major role in reducing poverty. Additionally, international efforts that supply equipment and services rather than money are more resistant to resource misappropriation issues that pose problems in less stable governments.

UNEP has developed a loan program to stimulate renewable energy market forces with attractive return rates, buffer initial deployment costs and entice consumers to consider and purchase renewable technology. After a successful solar loan program sponsored by UNEP that helped 100,000 people finance solar power systems in developing countries like India, UNEP started similar schemes in other parts of the developing world like Africa – Tunisia, Morocco, and Kenya projects are already functional and many projects in other African nations are in the pipeline. In Africa, UNEP assistance to Ghana, Kenya, and Namibia has resulted in the adoption of draft National Climate Awareness Plans, publications in local languages, radio programs and seminars. The Rural Energy Enterprise Development (REED) initiative is another flagship UNEP effort focused on enterprise development and seed financing for clean energy entrepreneurs in developing countries of West and Southern Africa.

The Government of South Africa has set up the South African Renewables Initiative (SARi) to develop a financing arrangement that would enable a critical mass of renewables to be developed in South Africa through a combination of international loans and grants, as well as domestic funding. This has been a highly successful program now known as the REIPPP (Renewable Energy Independent Power Producer Program), with four rounds of allocations already completed. In Round 1, 19 projects were allocated, in Round 2, 28 projects were allocated, in Round 3, 17 projects were allocated and in Round 4, 26 projects were allocated. Over 6100 MW has been allocated with a total of R194 billion (US$16 billion) being invested in this program. This investment figure represents full funding from private entities and banks – there are no government subsidies for this program.

=== Energy sector regulators as facilitators ===
The funding of renewable energy (RE) projects is dependent on the credibility of the institutions developing and implementing RE policy. This places a particular burden on the energy regulators in Africa, whose professional staff may be few in number and who have track records of only a decade or so. Rules (micro policies) made by regulators are subsidiary to overall government RE policy and depend on some delegation of authority from the state. Nevertheless, there are instances when the sector regulator can be proactive on behalf of customer and utility concerns—providing facts, reports, and public statements that build a case for care in the design of public policy towards RE. Clean and renewable energy is likely to be of concern to a number of organizations. Interaction between multiple authorities requires coordination to align policies, incentives, and administrative processes (including licensing and permitting). Of course, the making of policy by regulators is incidental to and inherent in their duty to decide specific cases or disputes. This micro policy-making role is derived from the fact that macro RE policy cannot reasonably be expected to anticipate all aspects of policy that will have to evolve for the regulatory process to be fully functional. This point is particularly important in the area of renewable energy, with its rapidly changing technologies and ever-changing public (and political) attitudes. Gaps will have to be filled and it is the regulators, with their functional responsibilities, technical expertise, and hands-on experience that are best positioned to accomplish that task in developing countries. Thus, for designing auctions for purchasing power or establishing feed-in tariffs or other instruments promoting RE, the energy sector regulator has a significant impact on the penetration of RE in Africa and other regions.

=== Investments ===
Africa has historically received less than 2% of global investments in renewable energy over the past two decades, leading to inadequate energy access for three-quarters of its population. In response, the Accelerated Partnership for Renewables in Africa (APRA) was launched at COP28, following the Nairobi Declaration on Climate Change. This initiative aims to dramatically increase Africa's renewable energy capacity from 56 GW in 2022 to 300 GW by 2030. APRA focuses on mobilizing finance, engaging the private sector, and providing targeted assistance to tailor energy solutions to the specific needs of African nations, thereby driving transformative change and promoting sustainable economic growth across the continent.

Total renewable energy capacity 2015–2024 (MW)
2015	2016	2017	2018	2019	2020	2021	2022	2023	2024
34,776	37,498	42,861	48,189	50,315	53,679	55,580	59,291	62,672	66,898

== Renewable energy use ==
=== Solar power ===
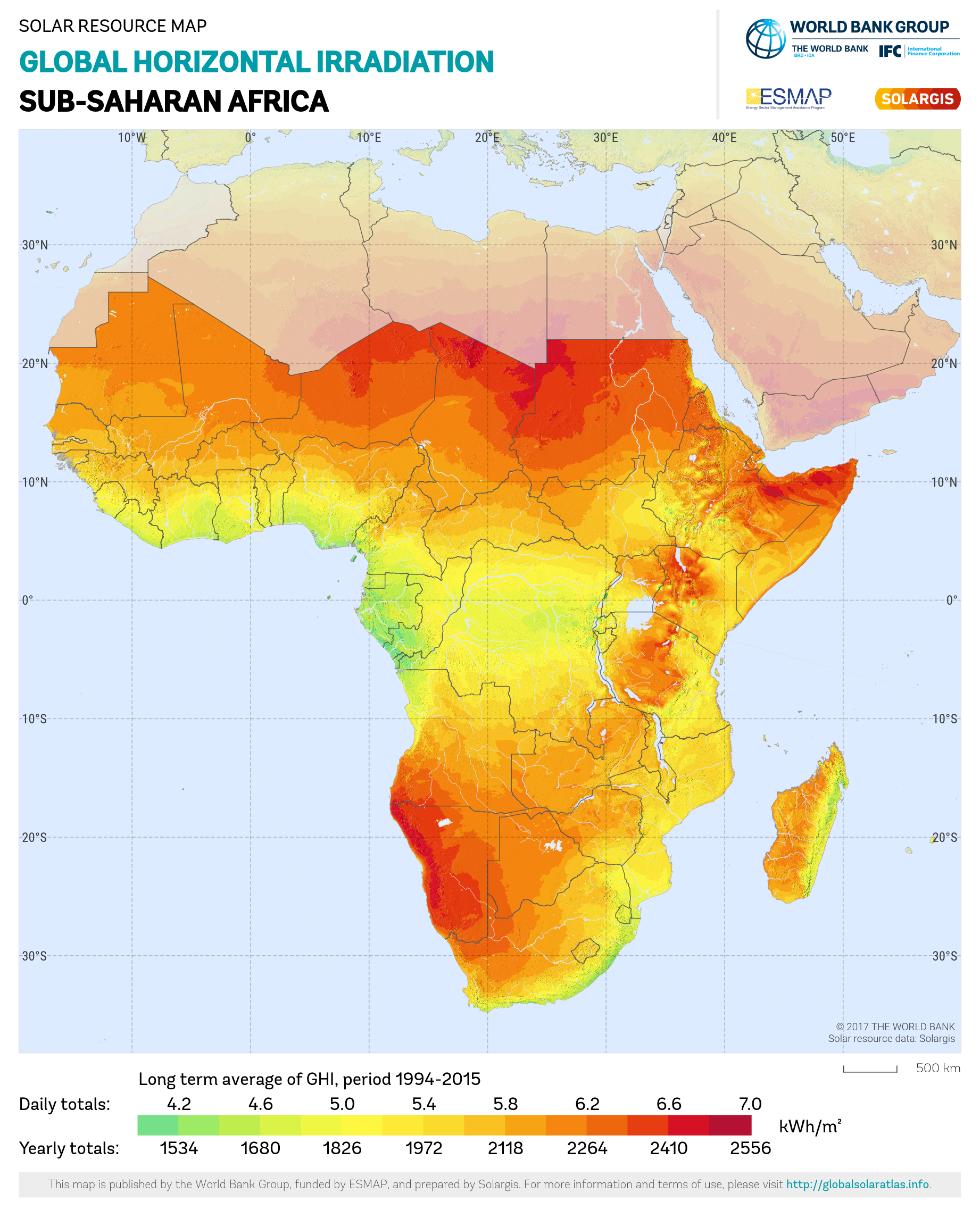
Global Horizontal Irradiation in Sub-Saharan Africa.

Several large-scale solar power facilities are under development in Africa including projects in South Africa and Algeria. Although solar power technology has the potential to supply energy to large numbers of people and has been used to generate power on a large scale in developed nations, its greatest potential in Africa may be to provide power on a smaller scale and to use this energy to help with day-to-day needs such as small-scale electrification, desalination, water pumping, and water purification.

The first utility-scale solar farm in Sub-Saharan Africa is the 8.5 MW plant at Agahozo-Shalom Youth Village, in the Rwamagana District, Eastern Province of Rwanda. It leased 20 hectares (49 acres) of land from the village, which is a charity to house and educate Rwandan genocide victims. The plant uses 28,360 photovoltaic panels and produces 6% of the total electrical supply of the country. The project was built with U.S., Israeli, Dutch, Norwegian, Finnish and UK funding and expertise.

There are several examples of small grid-linked solar power stations in Africa, including the photovoltaic 250 kW Kigali Solaire station in Rwanda. Under the South Africa Renewable Energy Independent Power Producer Procurement Program, several projects have been developed, including the 96 MW (DC) Jasper Solar Energy Project, the 75 MW (DC) Lesedi PV project, and the 75 MW (DC) Letsatsi PV Project, all developed by the American company SolarReserve and completed in 2014.

Total Solar energy capacity 2015–2024 (MW)
2015	2016	2017	2018	2019	2020	2021	2022	2023	2024
2,114	3,301	5,023	7,922	9,279	10,644	11,570	12,614	13,516	15,378

Power Up Gambia, a non-profit operating in The Gambia, uses solar power technology to provide power to Gambian health care facilities, providing a reliable source of electricity for lighting, diagnostic testing, treatments, and water pumping. Energy For Opportunity (EFO), a non-profit working in West Africa, uses solar power for schools, health clinics and community charging stations, as well as teaches photovoltaic installation classes at local technical institutes. So far its work has been mainly in Sierra Leone. In particular, its solar powered community charging stations have been recognized as an innovative model to provide electricity to rural communities in the region.

Some plans exist to build solar farms in the deserts of North Africa to supply power for Europe. The Desertec project, backed by several European energy companies and banks, planned to generate renewable electricity in the Sahara desert and distribute it through a high-voltage grid for export to Europe and local consumption in North Africa. Ambitions seek to provide continental Europe with up to 15% of its electricity. The TuNur project would supply 2 GW of solar generated electricity from Tunisia to the UK.

In the Eastern and Southern Africa region, solar power has been identified as a key component in addressing the energy access deficit. The region's abundant sunlight offers a significant potential for solar energy to be harnessed, contributing to sustainable economic growth. By 2050, Sub-Saharan Africa is estimated to require around 3 billion tons of minerals and metals to support the deployment of solar energy among other renewable resources.

=== Solar water pumping ===
One of the most immediate and lethal problems facing many third world countries is the availability of clean drinking water. Solar powered technologies can help alleviate this problem with minimal cost using a combination of solar powered well pumping, a water tower or other holding tank, and a solar powered water purifier. These technologies require minimal maintenance, have low operational costs, and once set up, will help provide clean water for drinking and agriculture. With large enough reservoirs for the water that has been pumped and purified with solar powered technology, a community will be better able to withstand drought or famine. This reservoir water could be consumed by humans or livestock or used to irrigate community gardens and fields, thus improving crop yields and community health. A solar powered water purification system can be used to clean many pathogens and germs from groundwater and runoff. A group of these devices, filtering the water from wells or runoff, could help with poor sanitation and controlling the spread of waterborne illnesses.

Kenya may be a good candidate for testing out these systems because of its relatively well-funded department of agriculture, including the Kenya Agricultural Research Center, which provides funding and oversight to many projects investigating experimental methods and technologies.

Even though this solar technology may have a higher starting cost than that of conventional fossil fuel, the low maintenance and operation cost and the ability to operate without fuel makes the solar powered systems cheaper to keep running. A small rural community could use a system like this indefinitely, and it would provide clean drinking water at a negligible cost after the initial equipment purchase and setup. In a larger community, it could at least contribute to the water supply and reduce pressures of daily survival. This technology is capable of pumping hundreds of gallons of water per day and is limited only by the amount of water available in the water table.

Solar powered water pumping and purification systems could help rural Africans fulfill one of their most basic needs for survival. Further field tests are in progress by organizations like KARI and the many corporations that manufacture the products needed.

Supplementing the well water would be collectingrunoff rainwater during the rainy season for later use in drought. Southern Africa has its own network of information sharing called SEARNET, which informs farmers of techniques to catch and store rainwater, with some seeing increased yields and additional harvests. This new network of farmers sharing their ideas with each other has led to a spread of both new and old ideas, and this has led to greater sustainability of water resources in the countries of Botswana, Ethiopia, Kenya, Malawi, Rwanda, Tanzania, Uganda, Zambia and Zimbabwe. This water could be used for agriculture or livestock or could be fed through a purifier to yield water suitable for human consumption.

==== Examples ====
A solar powered water pump and holding system was installed in Kayrati, Chad, in 2004 as compensation for land lost to oil development. This system utilizes a standard well pump powered by a photovoltaic panel array. The pumped water is stored in a water tower, providing the pressure needed to deliver water to homes in the area. This use of oil revenue to build infrastructure is an example of using profits to advance the standard of living in rural areas.

Hundreds of solar water pumping stations in Sudan fulfill a similar role, involving various applications of different systems for pumping and storage. Over the past 10 years approximately. 250 photovoltaic water pumps have been installed in Sudan. Considerable progress has been made and the present generation of systems appear to be reliable and cost–effective under certain conditions. A photovoltaic pumping system to pump 25 cubic metres per day requires a solar array of approx. 800 Wp. Such a pump would cost US$6000, since the total system comprises the cost of modules, pump, motor, pipework, wiring, control system and array support structure. PV water pumping has been promoted successfully in Kordofan State in Sudan. It shows favorable economics as compared to diesel pumps and is free from the need to maintain a regular supply of fuel. The only maintenance problems with PV pumping [are] due to the breakdown of pumps and not the failure of the PV devices.

The Solar Water Purifier, developed and manufactured by an Australian company, is a low-maintenance, low operational cost solution that is able to purify large amounts of water, even seawater, to levels better than human consumption standards set by the World Health Organization. This device works through the processes of evaporation and UV radiation. Light passes through the top layer of glass to the black plastic layer underneath. Heat from the solar radiation is trapped by the water and by the black plastic. This plastic layer is a series of connected troughs that separate the water as it evaporates and trickles down through the levels. The water is also subjected to UV radiation for an extended period of time as it moves through the device, which kills many bacteria, viruses, and other pathogens. In a sunny, equatorial area like much of Africa, this device is capable of purifying up to 45 liters per day from a single array. Additional arrays may be chained together for more capacity.

The Water School uses SODIS solar disinfection currently in target areas of Kenya and Uganda to help people drink water free of pathogens and disease-causing bacteria. SODIS is a UV process that kills microorganisms in the water to prevent waterborne disease. The science of the SODIS system is proven with over 20 years of research.

=== Wind power ===
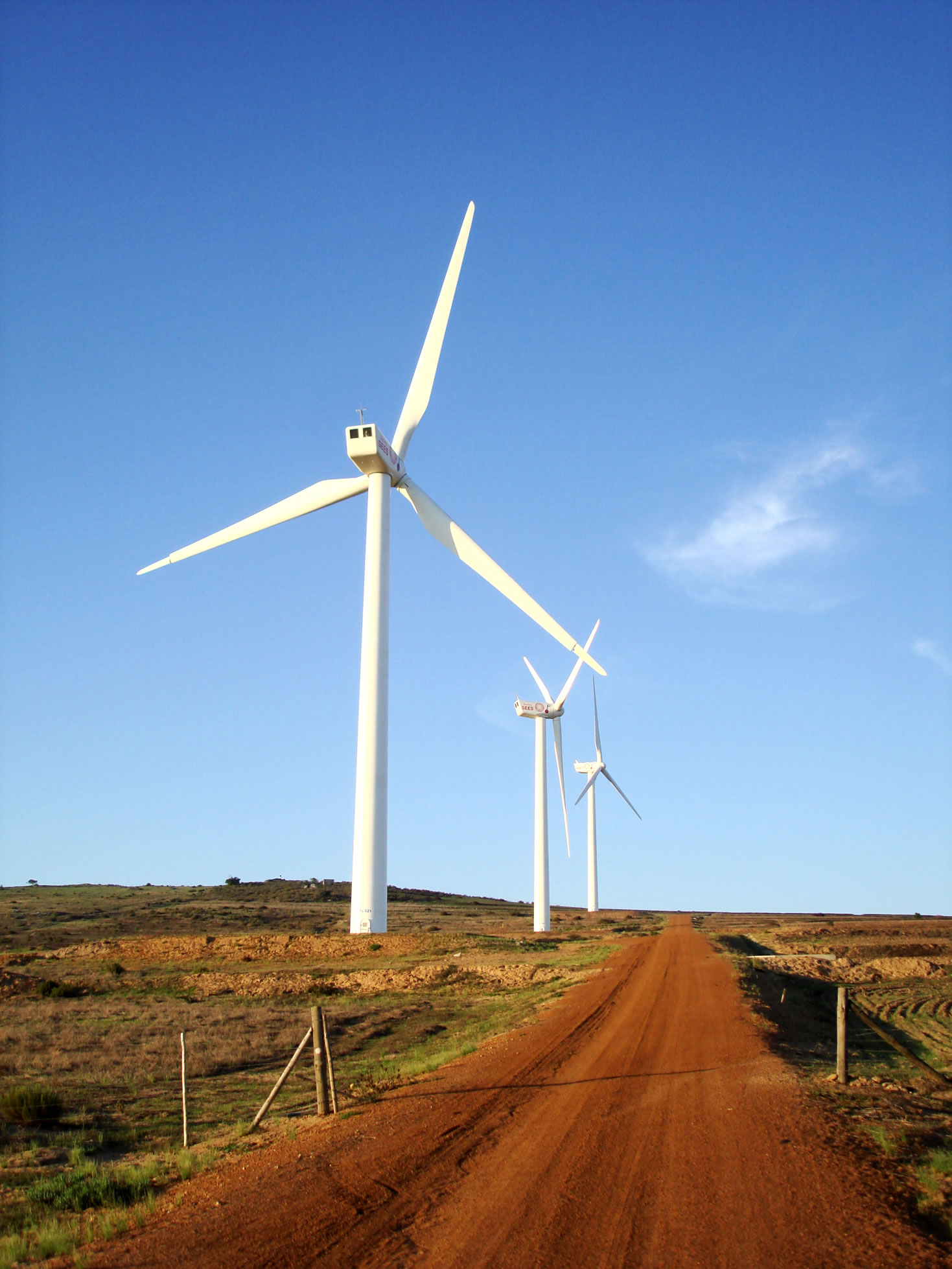
Darling Wind Farm in South Africa

Total Wind energy capacity 2015–2024 (MW)
2015	2016	2017	2018	2019	2020	2021	2022	2023	2024	2025
3,320	3,831	4,578	5,471	5,528	6,514	6,909	7,745	8,654	9,233	11,47

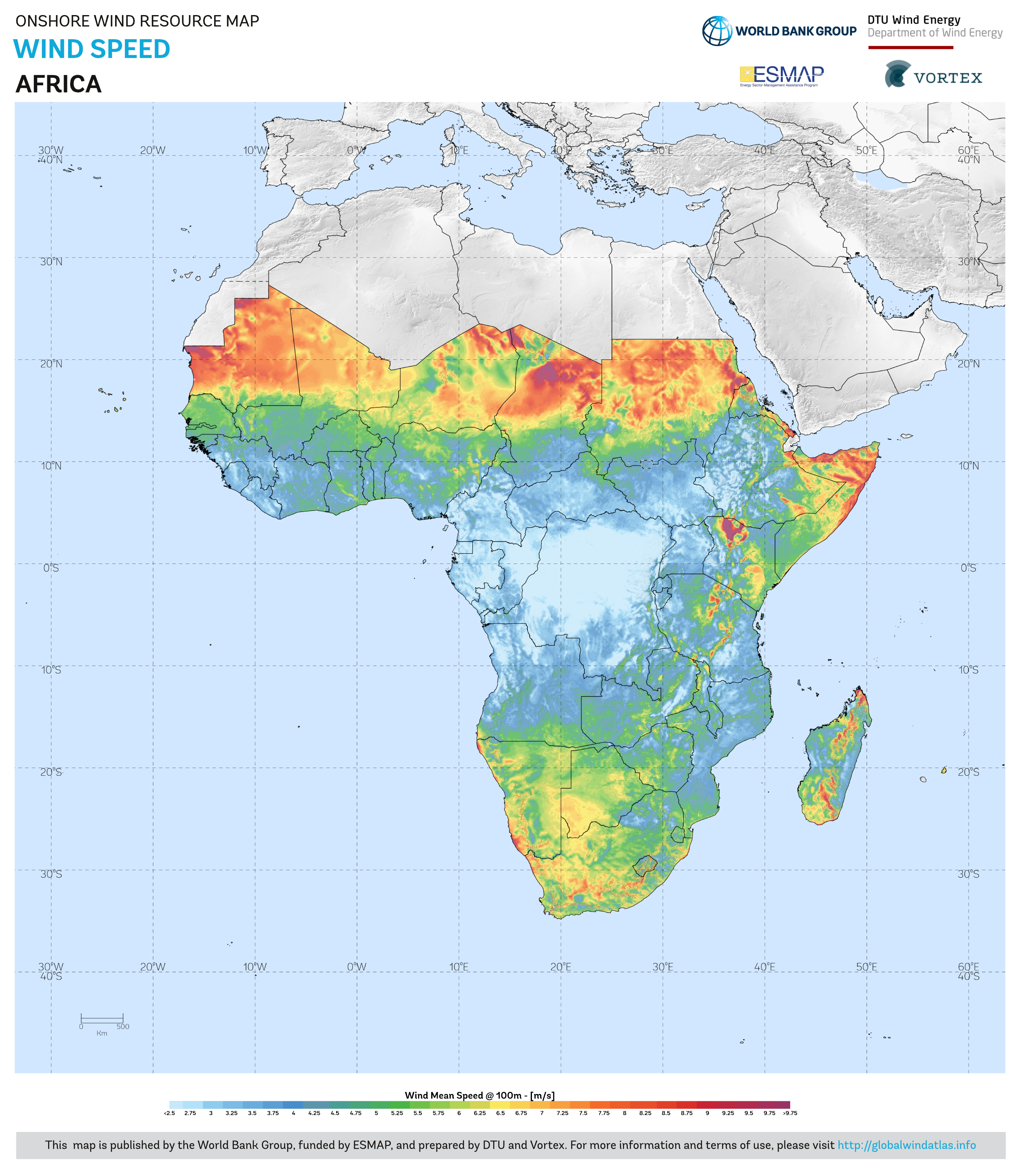
Wind Speed in Sub-Saharan Africa.

The Koudia Al Baida Farm in Morocco is the largest wind farm on the continent. Two other large wind farms are under construction in Tangier and Tarfaya.

Kenya is building a wind farm, the Lake Turkana Wind Power (LTWP), in Marsabit County. As Africa's largest wind farm, the project will increase the national electricity supply while creating jobs and reducing greenhouse gas emissions. LTWP is planned to produce 310 MW of wind power at full capacity.

In January 2009, the first wind turbine in West Africa was erected in Batokunku, a village in The Gambia. The 150 kilowatt turbine provides electrical power for the 2,000-person village.

The South African REIPPP has resulted in several wind farms already in commercial operation in the country. These wind farms are currently in operation in the provinces of the Eastern, Northern and Western Cape. It is estimated that 10 farms are already under construction or in operation, with 12 more being approved with the 4th round of the REIPPP.

=== Geothermal power ===
So far, only Kenya has exploited the geothermal potential of the Great Rift Valley. Kenya has been estimated to contain 10,000 MWe of potential geothermal energy, and has twenty potential drilling sites marked for survey in addition to three operational geothermal plants. Kenya was the first country in Africa to adopt geothermal energy, in 1956, and houses the largest geothermal power plant on the continent, Olkaria II, operated by Kengen, who also operate Olkaria I. A further plant, Olkaria III, is privately owned and operated.

Total Geothermal power capacity 2015–2024 (MW)
2015	2016	2017	2018	2019	2020	2021	2022	2023	2024
11,843	12,169	12,754	13,157	13,824	14,165	14,439	14,664	15,047	15,427

Ethiopia is home to a single binary-cycle plant but does not utilize its full potential energy output for lack of experience in its operation. Zambia has several sites planned for construction, but their projects have stalled due to lack of funds. Eritrea, Djibouti and Uganda have undertaken preliminary exploration for potential geothermal sources but have not constructed any type of power plant.

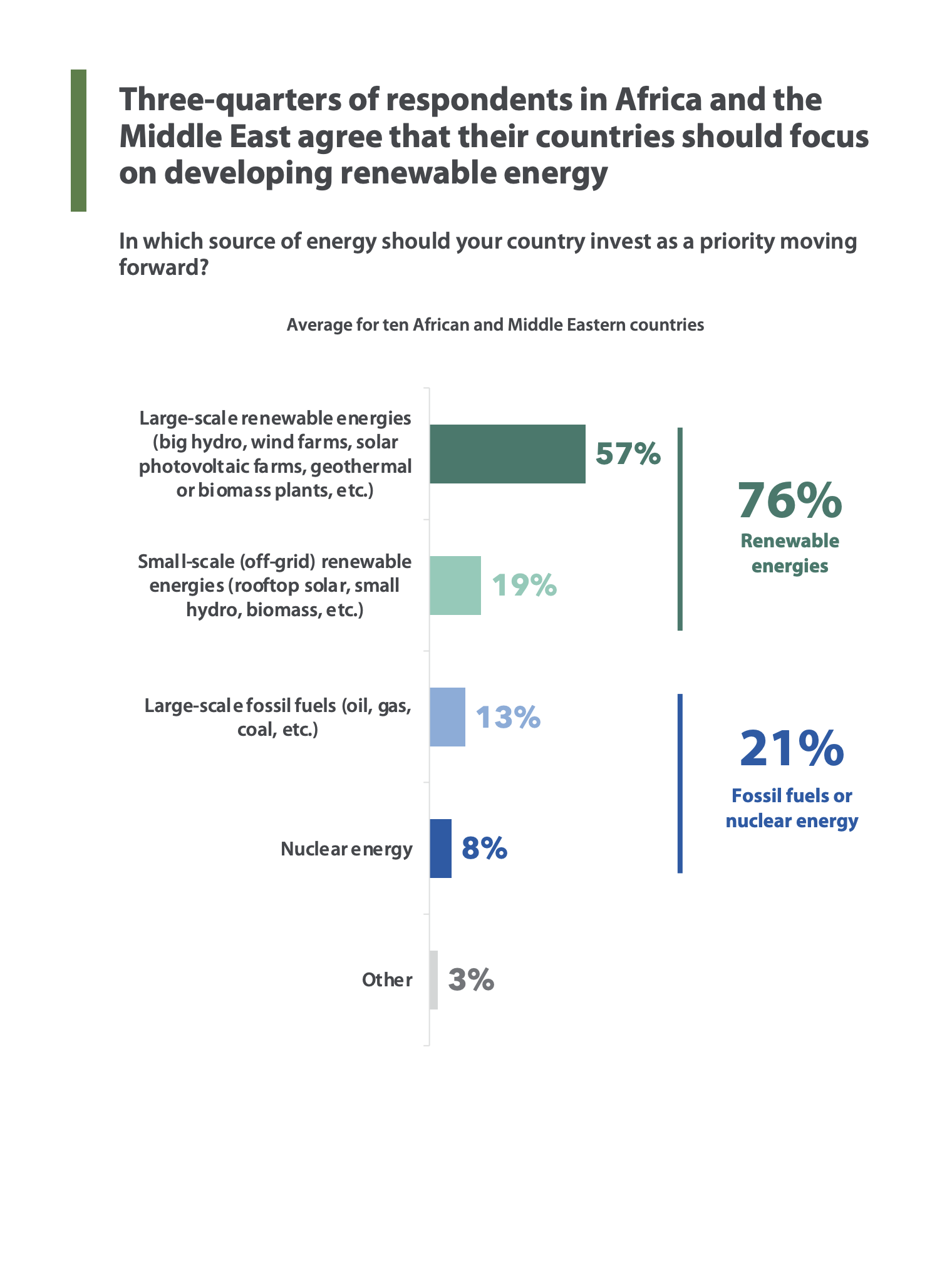
Three-quarters of respondents in Africa and the Middle East in a 2022 survey agree that their countries should focus on developing renewable energy.

Geothermal power has been used in agricultural projects in Africa. The Oserian flower farm in Kenya utilizes several steam wells abandoned by Kengen to power its greenhouse. In addition, the heat involved in the geothermal process is used to maintain stable greenhouse temperatures. The heat can also be utilized in cooking, which would help eliminate the dependence on wood burning.

==== Finance ====
Exploration and construction of future geothermal plants present a high cost for poor countries. Drilling potential sites alone costs millions of dollars and can result in zero energy return if the consistency of the heat and steam is unreliable. Returns on investments into geothermal power are not as quick as those into fossil fuels and may take years to pay off; however, low-maintenance cost and the renewable nature of geothermal energy mean more benefits in the long term.

As an early and successful adopter of geothermal power, Kenya now has significant financial backing from the World Bank. The country hosts development conferences between representatives of the UN Environment Program and various African governments.

=== Opportunities ===
Falling prices of solar panels and batteries

African Union's Agenda 2063 and African Renewable Energy Initiative (AREI) targeting 300 GW of renewable capacity by 2030

Continental Free Trade Area (AfCFTA) to boost clean energy trade

Off-grid solar solutions for rural electrification

== See also ==
- List of countries by carbon dioxide emissions
- Mains electricity by country
- Great Green Wall (China)
- List of energy storage projects
- List of renewable energy topics by country
- REN21
- Renewable Energy and Energy Efficiency Partnership
- Renewable energy commercialization
- Renewable energy in Asia
