= Akiira One Geothermal Power Station =

- Country: Kenya
- Location: Greater Olkaria Geothermal Area; Nakuru County
- Coordinates: 0°56′00″S 36°18′00″E
- Status: Planned
- Construction began: 2016 (Expected)
- Commission date: 2018 (Expected)
- Owner: Akiira Geothermal Limited

Power generation
- Nameplate capacity: 70 MW (94,000 hp) expandable to 140 MW (190,000 hp)

The Akiira One Geothermal Power Station, is a proposed 70 MW (94,000 hp) geothermal power plant in Kenya, the largest economy in the East African Community.

== Location ==
The facility is located in the Greater Olkaria Geothermal Area, about 12 kilometres (7.5 mi), by road, south of the existing Olkaria I Geothermal Power Station, and approximately 127 kilometres (79 mi), northwest of Nairobi, Kenya's capital and largest city.

== Overview ==
Centum Investments, a Kenyan investment company, in conjunction with three other non-Kenyan entities, jointly plan to construct the Akiira Geothermal Power Station at a projected cost of US$300 million, using Akiira Geothermal Limited, the special-purpose company they jointly own. The power station will be developed in phases, with the first 70 megawatts coming on-line by December 2018 and the next 70 megawatts added to the national grid at a later date. In August 2015, Akiira Geothermal Limited signed a power purchase agreement with Kenya Power and Lighting Company, at a cost of 9.23 US cents per kilowatt hour.

== Ownership ==
Akiira One Geothermal Power Station is owned by Akiira Geothermal Limited, a Kenyan limited liability company owned by Centum Investment Company Limited and three other non-Kenyan companies. The shareholding in Akiira Geothermal Limited is as depicted in the table below:

Akiira Geothermal Limited Stock Ownership
Rank	Name of Owner	Percentage Ownership
1	Centum Investments of Kenya	37.5
2	Ram Energy of the United States of America	
3	Marine Power of the USA	
4	Frontier Investment Management ApS of Denmark	
	Total	100.00

== Construction funding ==
The total construction bill is budgeted at US $300 million (KSh30 billion). Of that, 30 percent will be sourced from shareholders while the remaining 70 percent will be borrowed from Standard Bank. Akiira has already received a KSh86 million grant from the Overseas Private Investment Corporation (OPIC) in October 2014, as part of President Obama’s Power Africa programme. In January 2018, the European Investment Bank (EIB), offered to lend €155 million (KSh19.5 billion) on commercial terms, to fund the construction.

== See also ==
- List of power stations in Kenya
- Geothermal power in Kenya
- Olkaria I Geothermal Power Station
- Olkaria II Geothermal Power Station
- Olkaria III Geothermal Power Station
