= Youba Sokona =

Malian climatologist (born 1950)

Professor Youba Sokona FAAS FTWAS
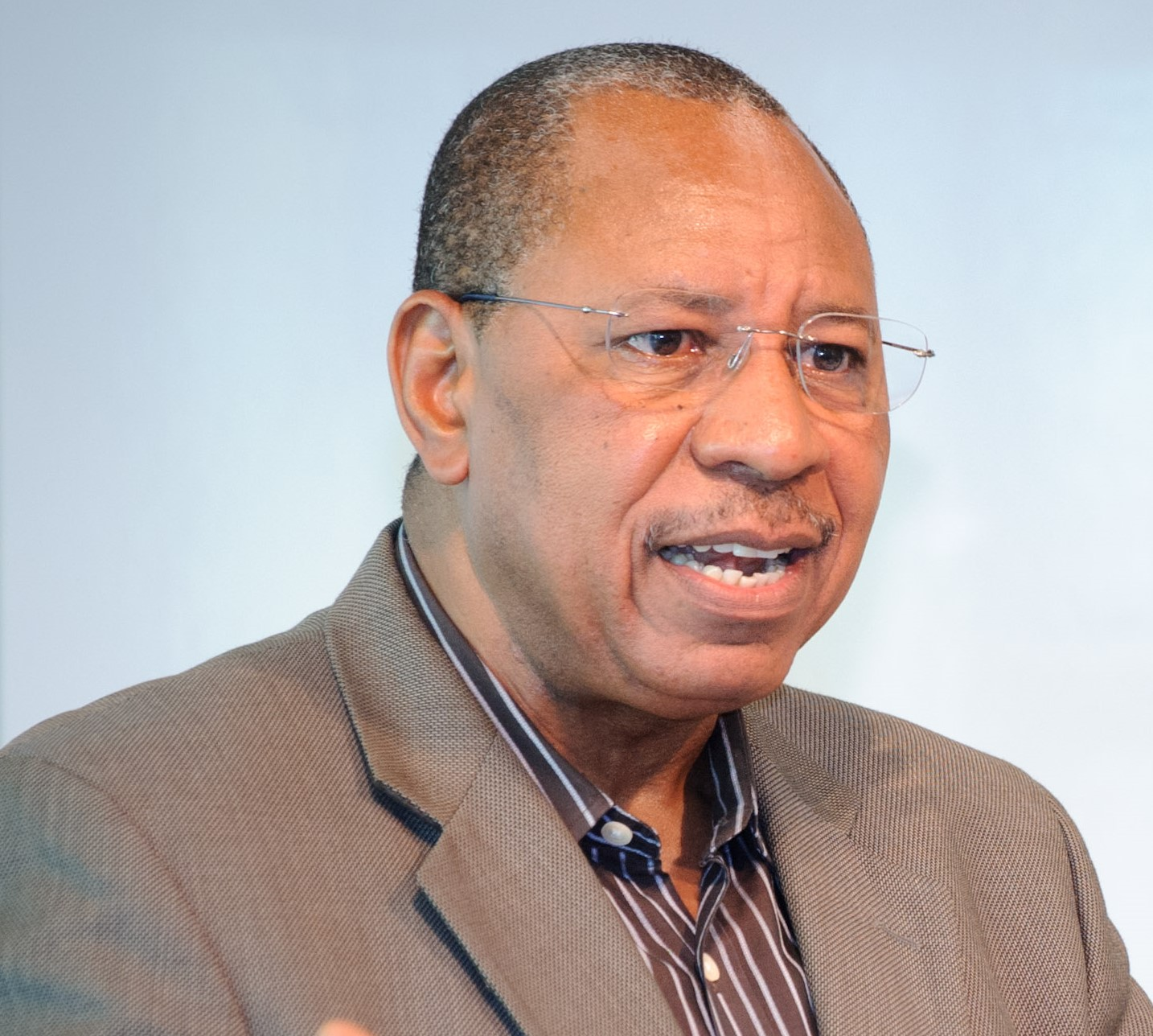
- Born: 23 May 1950 (age 76); Segou, Mali
- Education: Abderhamane Baba Touré National School of Engineers (BSc); Pierre and Marie Curie University (DEA); Mines Paris - PSL (PhD)
- Scientific career
- Fields: Energy; Sustainable development Climate change
- Workplaces: Intergovernmental Panel on Climate Change; Enda Third World; South Centre

Youba Sokona FAAS FTWAS (born 23 May 1950) is a Malian expert in the fields of energy and sustainable development, particularly in Africa. He has been the vice-chair of the Intergovernmental Panel on Climate Change (IPCC) since October 2015 and a lead author at the IPCC since 1990.

== Early life and education ==
Youba Sokona was born on 23 May 1950 in Segou, Mali.

In 1976, Youba Sokona obtained a Civil and Mining Engineering degree from the Abderhamane Baba Touré National School of Engineers, Mali. He continued his studies in France to pass a diploma of advanced studies (DEA) option Sciences of the Earth at the Pierre and Marie Curie University today Sorbonne University, Paris, which he finished in 1978. Sokona obtained his doctorate in Earth Sciences as a student of the École nationale supérieure des mines de Paris and the Pierre and Marie Curie University in Paris in 1981.

== Career and research ==
Youba research and commentary focuses on policies that affect energy, desertification, sustainable development, and climate change, particularly in Africa.

Sokona is a special advisor for sustainable development at the South Centre. At the same time, he is a member of many councils, organizations and institutions, a visiting professor at the University of Surrey, and a member of the Scientific Advisory Board of the International Institute for Applied Systems Analysis (IIASA) since January 2017 and until December 2022. He is Special Advisor to the Payne Institute for Public Policy at the Colorado School of Mines in the United States, Coordinator of the African Climate Policy Center ( ACPC).

=== Fight against climate change in Africa ===
In 1995 Youba Sokona published a Strategy for the rational use of energy in West Africa: evaluation and prospective for the organization Enda Third World where he was the co-founder of the Africa Renewable Energy Initiative, which he coordinated from 1987 to June 2004. In 2002, he published the article Mastering energy in West Africa. In 2008 he supervised the program of the Great Green Wall of the Sahara and the Sahel as executive secretary of the Sahara and Sahel Observatory.

Youba resigned from the Africa Renewable Energy Initiative on 30 April 2017, citing “European interference [to impose EU-preferred projects] in African governance that belongs to another era.” The initiative was replaced in 2017 due to row over European interference. Youba aired his frustration that academics at African institutions are often not consulted by policymakers or governments and their research and potential solutions are being while donor's ideas are being pushed forward.

=== IPCC ===
As a member of the Intergovernmental Panel on Climate Change (IPCC) and its main contributor since 1990, Youba Sokona has notably been co-chairman of working group III alongside Ottmar Edenhofer and Ramón Pichs Madruga, studying the role of renewable energies in the fight against climate change; their report, entitled IPCC special report on renewable energy sources and climate change mitigation, was published in 2014 in the fifth report of the IPCC.

In 2007, when the fourth report appeared, he was the lead author of the summary note, while being cited several times in the appendix to the Group III report; this same report was part of Why IPCC received Nobel Peace Prize with Al Gore in the same year. However, the IPCC came under unprecedented media scrutiny in 2009 in the run-up to the Copenhagen climate conference. This "Climatic Research Unit email controversy" involved the leak of emails from climate scientists. Many of these scientists were authors of the Fourth Assessment Report which came out in 2007. The discovery of an error in this report that the Himalayan glaciers would melt by 2035 put the IPCC under further pressure. Scientific bodies upheld the general findings of the Fourth Assessment Report and the IPCC's approach. But many people thought the IPCC should review the way it works.

Youba was elected vice-chair of IPCC in October 2015.

== Honours and awards ==
Sokona is an honorary professor at the University College London, and was elected a Fellow of the African Academy of Sciences since 2018, and a Fellow o f the World Academy of Sciences in 2022.
