= Akiira Geothermal Limited =

Coordinates: 00°19′59″S 37°07′43″E

- Type: Private
- Industry: Electric power generation
- Founded: 2014
- Headquarters: Nairobi, Kenya
- Key people: Robert Bunyi (CEO)
- Products: Electricity
- Website: Homepage

Akiira Geothermal Limited (AGL) is an electric energy generating company in Kenya. The company owns and will build and operate Akiira One Geothermal Power Station, a proposed 70 MW (94,000 hp), power station in Kenya.

== Overview ==
AGL is a special purpose vehicle formed by the consortium that owns, will design, build and operate Akiira One Geothermal Power Station, scheduled to come online in 2018. In 2014, the company received a US$950,000 grant from OPIC to offset some of the drilling expenses. In March 2016, AGL accepted a grant of KSh138.9 million (approx. US$1.4 million), from the African Union Commission, to mitigate some of the costs of drilling the geothermal wells for the power station, that is ongoing since August 2015.

== Power stations ==
AGL owns and operates Akiira One Geothermal Power Station, a 70 megawatt geothermal station to be built in the Greater Olkaria Geothermal Area at a budgeted cost of US$300 million (KSh30 billion). Of that, 70 percent will be borrowed from Standard Bank while the remaining 30 percent will be provided by the shareholders. AGL has already received a KSh86 million grant from the Overseas Private Investment Corporation (OPIC) in October 2014, as part of President Obama’s Power Africa program.

== Ownership ==
Akiira Geothermal Limited owns and will design, build and operate Akiira One Geothermal Power Station. The company is owned by Centum Investment Company Limited and three other non-Kenyan companies. The shareholding in AGL is as depicted in the table below:

Akiira Geothermal Limited stock ownership
Rank	Name of owner	Percentage ownership
1	Centum Investment Company Limited of Kenya	70.0
2	Ram Energy of the United States	
3	Marine Power of the United States	
4	Frontier Investment Management ApS of Denmark	
	Total	100.00
