= Olkaria V Geothermal Power Station =

Kenyan power station

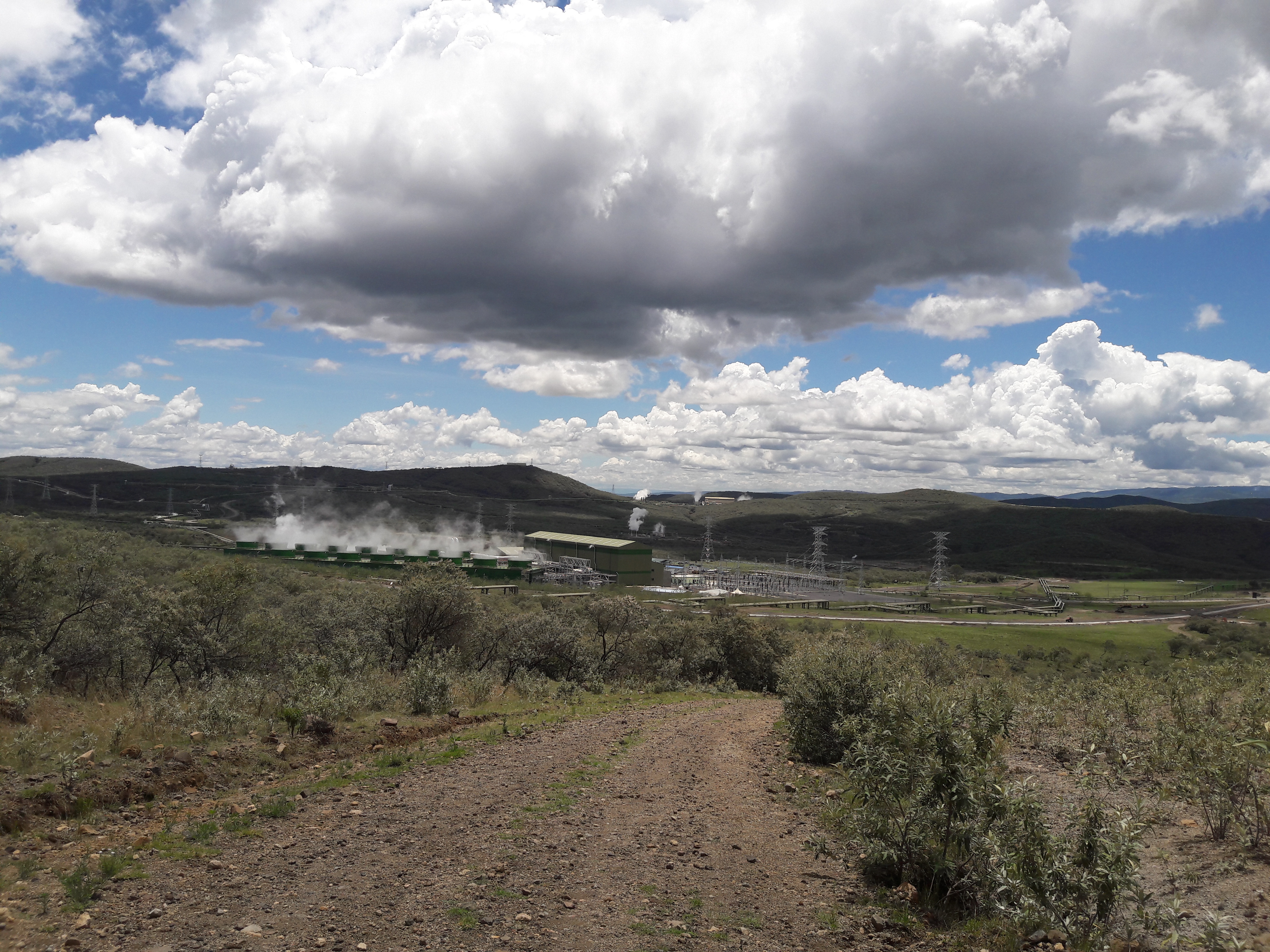
- Location of Olkaria 5 Geothermal Power Station
- Country: Kenya
- Location: Hell's Gate National Park
- Coordinates: 00°53′59″S 36°21′02″E
- Status: Operational
- Construction began: 2017
- Commission date: 2019
- Owner: Kengen
- Operator: Kenya Electricity Generating Company

Power generation
- Units operational: 2 x 79MW
- Nameplate capacity: 158 megawatts (212,000 hp)

The Olkaria V Geothermal Power Station, also known as the Olkaria V Geothermal Power Plant, is a power station in Kenya, with an electric capacity of 158 megawatts (212,000 hp).

== Location ==
The power station is located in the Olkaria area, in Hell's Gate National Park, in Nakuru County, approximately 100 kilometres (62 mi), by road, southeast of the city of Nakuru, where the county headquarters are located. Olkaria V Geothermal Power Station is located approximately 122 kilometres (76 mi), by road, northwest of Nairobi. The geographical coordinates of the power station are:00°54'59.0"S, 36°21'02.0"E (Latitude:-0.906944; Longitude:36.323333).

== Overview ==
The Olkaria 5 project generates 140 MW, although other reliable sources have put planned capacity at 158 megawatts (212,000 hp). The power station is jointly financed by the Japan International Cooperation Agency (JICA) and the Kenya Electricity Generating Company (KenGen). The budgeted cost is Sh40 billion (US$400 million).

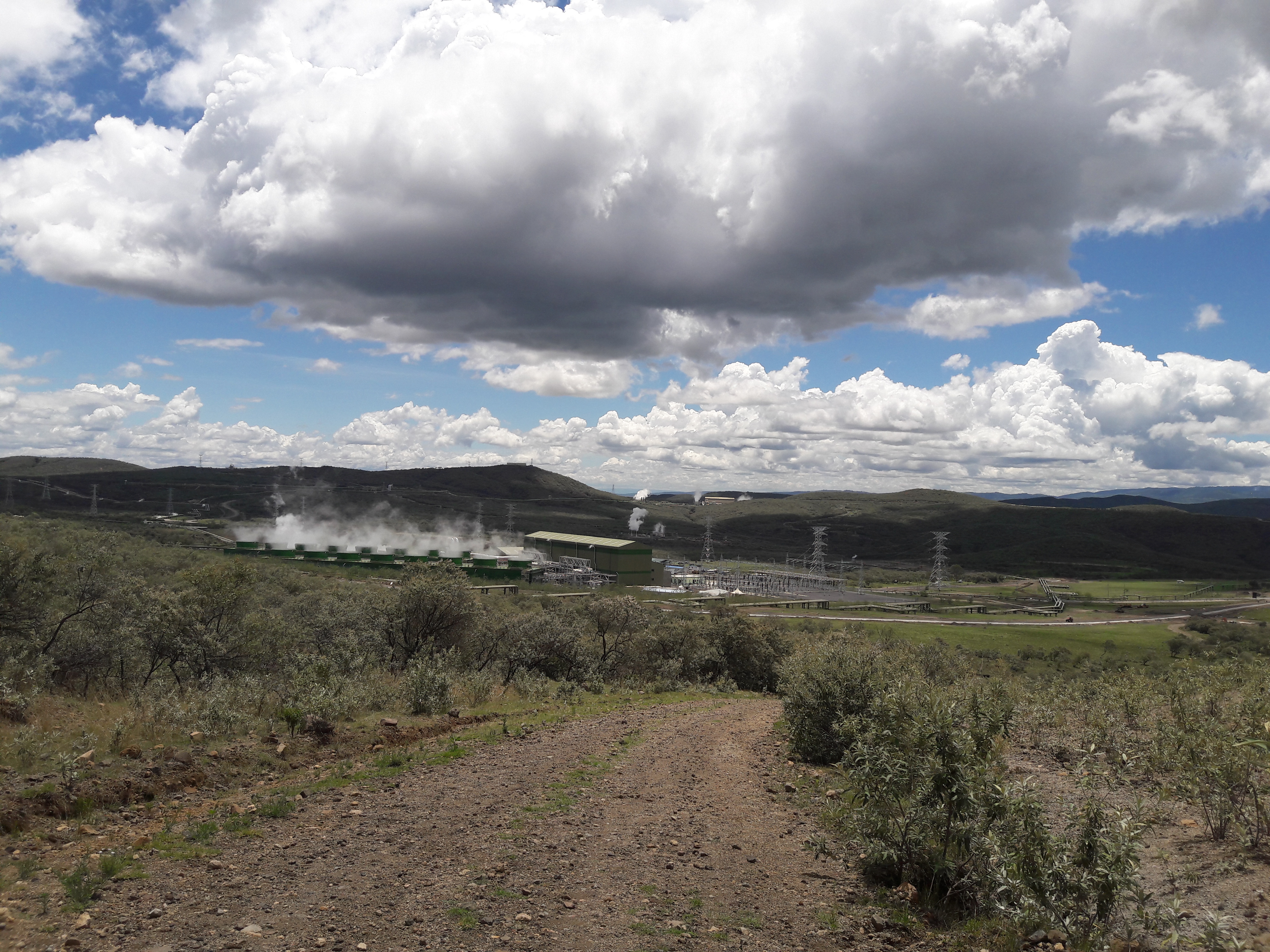
Olkaria V Geothermal Power Station

A consortium of two Japanese firms and one Kenyan company, was selected to provide the necessary equipment and build the power plant. Mitsubishi Corporation supplied the main equipment. Mitsubishi Hitachi Power Systems transported the equipment from the port of Mombasa to the construction site at Olkaria and installed the machinery. H Young & Company (HY), a Kenyan outfit, supplied the remaining parts required to construct the power station. HY was also responsible for civil engineering works and installation of the parts that they provide.

The Olkaria V plant in Great Rift Valley, Kenya was first synchronized to the National Grid on 28 June 2019 and its first unit has reached its full design output of 79 megawatts. A second unit came online in October 2019, bringing Kenya's total geothermal capacity to between 700MW and 850MW.

== History ==
Olkaria 5 power plant is another in a series of six geothermal stations either planned or already operational in the Olkaria area in Nakuru County. Construction began in April 2017. Completion and commercial power production began in 2019.

== Ownership ==
Olkaria V Geothermal Power Station is wholly owned by the Kenya Electricity Generating Company (KenGen).

== See also ==
- List of power stations in Kenya
- Geothermal power in Kenya
- Olkaria I Geothermal Power Station
- Olkaria II Geothermal Power Station
- Olkaria III Geothermal Power Station
- Olkaria IV Geothermal Power Station
