= Wanjii Hydroelectric Power Station =

Hydro-electric power station in Muranga, Kenya

- Location within Kenya
- Country: Kenya
- Coordinates: 00°44′58″S 37°10′29″E
- Purpose: Power
- Status: Operational
- Opening date: 1952; 74 years ago
- Owner: Kenya Electricity Generating Company

Wanjii Hydroelectric Power Station
- Operator: Kenya Electricity Generating Company
- Commission date: 1952
- Type: Reservoir
- Turbines: 4 X 1.85MW
- Installed capacity: 7.4 MW (9,900 hp)

The Wanjii Hydroelectric Power Station is a 7.4 MW (9,900 hp) hydroelectric power station in Kenya.

== Location ==
The power station is located near the village of Kambirwa, in Muranga County, approximately 82 kilometres (51 mi), by road, northeast of Nairobi, the capital and largest city in Kenya. The coordinates of Wanjii Power Station are: 0°44'58.0"S, 37°10'29.0"E (Latitude:-0.749437; Longitude:37.174731).

== Overview ==
Wanjii power station was commissioned in 1952. The power station draws its waters from the Mathioya River and the Maragwa River stored in the Wanjii Reservoir on the Maragwa River.

== Ownership ==
Wanjii Hydroelectric Power Station is owned by Kenya Electricity Generating Company, a parastatal company of the government of Kenya.

== See also ==
- List of power stations in Kenya
