= Enda Third World =

International organisation

Enda Third World (Enda Tiers Monde) is an international organisation with diplomatic status based in Dakar, Senegal, Africa. It comprises a group of teams and programmes working in synergy, and describes itself as a network of decentralized nodes worldwide.

== History ==
Enda, formed in 1972, completed its 25th anniversary in 1997. Enda was founded in Dakar; its head office is also located in the same African city. The company is composed of separate entities, co-ordinated by an executive secretary.

== Activities ==
According to its report in 1997 :

- Enda is active in various domains linked to environmental development. There are 24 thematic teams at the head office in Dakar.
- Enda is also active in many southern countries. It has some 21 decentralised branches, 14 in Africa, 5 in South America and 2 in Asia.
- The organisation is also represented in Europe and will be in Japan in the future.

== Concerns ==
Enda says it is concerned with "acting on initiatives and on popular action". It argues that individual and collective initiative is important (particularly a problem … raised by the poor). It argues in favour of community-based organisations and community movements (rural and urban associations which bring together youth and women with professionals, consumers and local or national federations etc.). Enda says it focuses on carrying out socio-economic, sanitary and social services in a way that serves the poor.

In 2005–06, ENDA took part in the 2005 World Social Forum at Porto Alegre in January 2006. It took part in themes focusing on the right to the city; popular responses to privatisation; youth, violence, urban segregation; Afro-descendants in Latin America; urban architecture; and sustainable development.

This organisation is also referred to as Environment and Development Action. It has also supported activities of the African Social Forum held in Conakry, Guinea.

== Aims, approaches ==
ENDA's aims include working with grassroot groups, contributing to the search for "alternative development possibilities", and contributing to intellectuals' and trained personnel's involvement to set up development programmes. ENDA works "by carrying out, on the basis of grassroots development actions and the struggle of the peoples of the Third World, a permanent search for a methodology which will cater for their need and desire for independence." It focuses on integrated action, reflection and training; and prioritises local, technical, human and national resources. It lists its priorities as human and people's rights; support for culturally threatened peoples; socio-spatial disparities; children and youth in face of unemployment; articulation of the administration/population relationship; combined technologies; ecology and the urban popular economy; grassroots communication; the fight against "imported consumption patterns and production models"; and actions against AIDS; among others.

== Activities, office ==
ENDA says its activities have increased sixfold between 1980 and 1991.

Its head office is at 4 & 5, rue Kléber, BP 3370, Dakar (Senegal). Its president is Cheikh Hamidou Kane and executive secretary is Jacques Bugnicourt.
