= Kigali Solaire =

Solar power plant in Rwanda

Kigali Solaire is a solar power plant in Rwanda and at the time of construction was Africa's largest grid-tied solar energy installation. It was built in 2006 on Mont Jali near the capital Kigali. The plant uses photovoltaics and has a peak output of 250 kW and an estimated annual output of 325,000 kWh. It was financed by the German city of Mainz's utility company Stadtwerke Mainz AG (now: Mainzer Stadtwerke AG), with Mainz being the capital of Rhineland-Palatinate, which has a partnership with Rwanda.

The plant is only part of the initiative, consisting also of distributing 30 photovoltaic panels of 1 kW each to villages outside the countries power grid, which accesses only 5% of the country. The small stations are usually installed on the roof of hospitals or schools. The initiative is also financing and training local technicians for the maintenance of all the installations.
