= Olkaria IV Geothermal Power Station =

Power station in Kenya

- Country: Kenya
- Location: Olkaria, Nakuru County, Kenya
- Coordinates: 0°55′05″S 36°20′04″E
- Status: Operational
- Commission date: 2014
- Owner: KenGen

Power generation
- Nameplate capacity: 140 MW (190,000 hp)

The Olkaria IV Geothermal Power Station is an operational geothermal power plant in Kenya, with installed capacity of 140 megawatts (190,000 hp).

== Location ==
The power station is located in the Olkaria area, in Nakuru County, adjacent to Hell's Gate National Park, approximately 114 kilometres (71 mi), southeast of Nakuru, where the county headquarters are located. This is approximately 122 kilometres (76 mi), by road, northwest of Nairobi, the capital and largest city of Kenya. The geographical coordinates of Olkaria IV Geothermal Power Station are 0°55'05.0"S, 36°20'04.0"E (Latitude:-0.918056; Longitude:36.334444).

== Overview ==
The power station is one of six geothermal power plants currently either operational, under constriction or planned in the Olkaria area in Nakuru County, Kenya. Olkaria I, Olkaria II, Olkaria III and Olkaria IV are operational. Olkaria V is under construction and Olkaria VI is planned for 2021.

Olkaria IV Geothermal Power Station was commissioned by Uhuru Kenyatta, the president of Kenya, on 22 October 2014. The 140 megawatts (187,743 hp) power station cost KSh11.5 billion (US$126.5 million) to build, co-financed by the World Bank, the Kenya government and the European Investment Bank. The electromechanical parts were supplied by Hyundai Engineering of South Korea, Toyota Tsusho of Japan, and KEC International of India.

A thousand Maasai people were relocated for the project in August 2014.

== Ownership ==
Olkaria IV Power Station is owned by Kenya Electricity Generating Company (KenGen), whose shares are publicly traded on the Nairobi Stock Exchange, and is 70 per cent owned by the government of Kenya with the remaining 30 percent owned by private institutions and individuals.

== See also ==
- List of power stations in Kenya
- Geothermal power in Kenya
- Olkaria III Geothermal Power Station
- Olkaria V Geothermal Power Station
