= Kayrati =

Village in Chad

Kayrati (Arabic: كايراتي) is a village in Chad.

In 2004 a water tower with a solar-powered pump was constructed to raise groundwater and distribute it to public taps. It was built as compensation for land lost to oil development.
