= Geothermal power in Kenya =

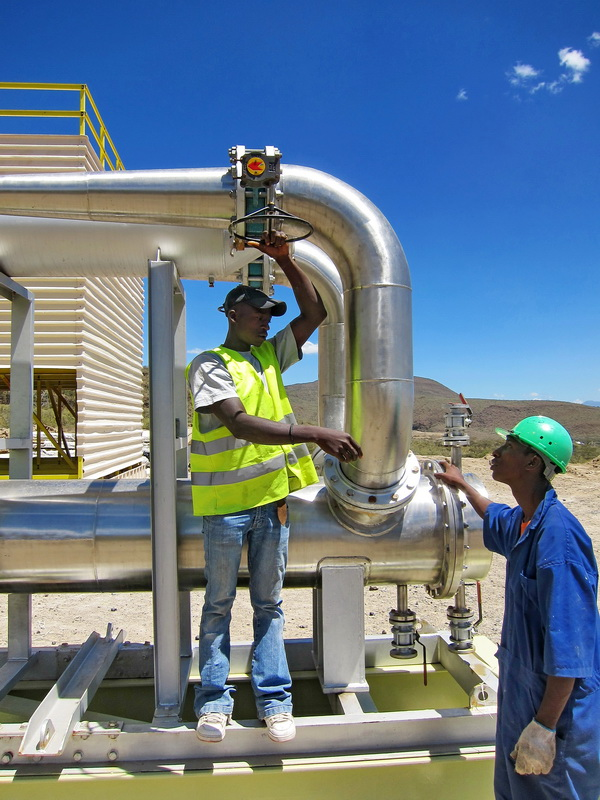
Workers at Olkaria Geothermal Power Plant

Geothermal power is very cost-effective in the Great Rift Valley of Kenya, East Africa. As of 2023, Kenya has 891.8 MW of installed geothermal capacity. Kenya was the first African country to build geothermal energy sources. The Kenya Electricity Generating Company, which is 74% state-owned, has built several plants to exploit the Olkaria geothermal resource; Olkaria I (268.3 MW), Olkaria II (105 MW), Olkaria IV (140 MW), Olkaria V (158 MW), and Wellhead generation plants (75 MW), with a third private plant Olkaria III (139 MW). Additionally, a pilot wellhead plant of 2.5 MW has been commissioned at Eburru, and two small scale plants with a total of 4 MW have been built by Oserian Development Company powering businesses on and around Oserian land.

Currently, the exploration of geothermal wells in Kenya as well as sale of geothermal steam to the Kenya Electricity Generating Company and independent power producers for the purpose of electricity generation is undertaken by the Geothermal Development Company.

== Future development goals ==
By 2030 Kenya aims to have 5,530 MW of geothermal power or 51% of total capacity. This will make it Kenya's largest source of clean energy by 2030.

Geothermal power plants have a prominent place in Kenya's overarching development plans. These include the Vision 2030, the NCCAP, and the current ‘5000+ MW in 40 months initiative’. Geothermal power has the potential to provide reliable, cost-competitive, baseload power with a small carbon footprint, and reduces vulnerability to climate by diversifying power supply away from hydropower, which currently provides the majority of Kenya's electricity. Kenya has set out ambitious targets for geothermal energy. It aims to expand its geothermal power production capacity to 5,000 MW by 2030, with a medium-term target of installing 1,887 MW by 2017. Although there is significant political will and ambition, reaching these ambitious goals is a major challenge.

The Kenyan Government's plan to increase geothermal energy production to over 5,000 MW by 2030 is part of Kenya Vision 2030, which highlights the country's ambition to become a middle-income country by 2030. As part of its commitment to reduce greenhouse gas emissions in Eastern Africa, the European Investment Bank (EIB) has agreed to invest $95 million in geothermal power projects across the region. The Kenya Vision 2030 plans to drilling a total of 630 geothermal steam production wells which will be drilled, developed and completed by 2017 at Olkaria (80), Menengai Phase 1(120), Menengai Phase 2 (210), and Silali-Bogoria Phase 1 (210).

== See also ==
- Energy in Kenya
- Renewable energy in Kenya
- List of power stations in Kenya
- Hydroelectric power in Kenya
- Wind power in Kenya
- List of countries by renewable electricity production
- Renewable energy by country
