= Olkaria =

Geothermal region in Kenya

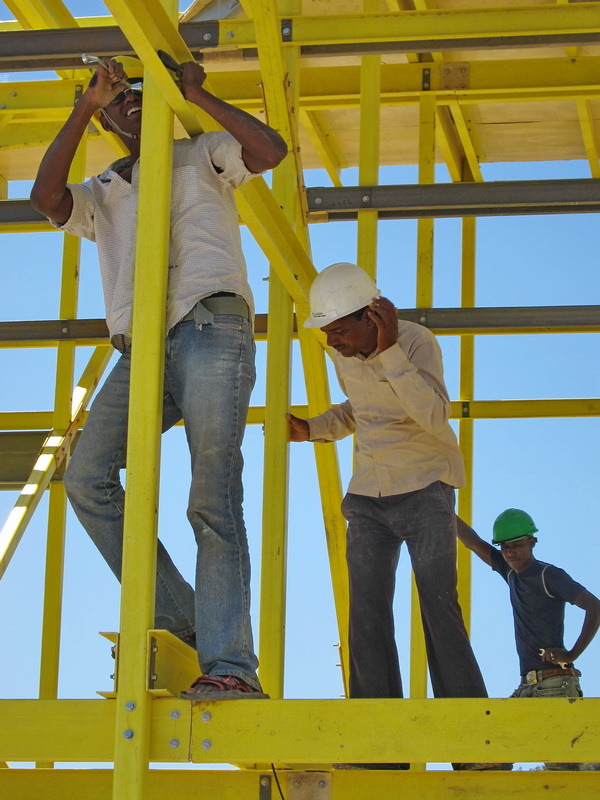
- Construction in Olkaria, 2011

Highest point
- Elevation: 2,434 m (7,986 ft)
- Coordinates: 0°53′09″S 36°16′12″E

Geography
- Location within Kenya
- Location: Kenya

Geology
- Mountain type: Volcanic complex
- Last eruption: 1770 ± 50 years

The Olkaria Area is a region located immediately to the south of Lake Naivasha in the Great Rift Valley of Kenya, Africa. It is geothermally active and is being used to generate clean electric power. The region has an estimated potential of 2,000 MW. This is almost double the maximum daily electricity peak demand recorded in 2008/2009 for the entire country.

== Location ==
The geothermal complex and power plants lie within the Hell's Gate National Park. The Olkaria volcanic area is about 120 kilometres (75 mi) from Nairobi. It lies south of the Ol Doinyo Eburru complex and north of Mount Suswa; it is east of the rift valley's western margin and west of Mount Longonot, a stratovolcano. The volcanic field covers 240 square kilometres (93 sq mi).

The largest structure is Olkaria Hill, 2 kilometres (1.2 mi) across and 340 metres (1,120 ft) high. A narrow gorge that crosses the complex with cliffs up to 200 metres (660 ft) high was formed by water flowing out of Lake Naivasha during a period in the past when water levels were much higher than today.

== Volcanism ==
The surface at Olkaria is dominated by a peralkaline rhyolite dome and lava field. The complex contains many centers of volcanic activity that often erupt in small volumes. There are at least eighty such centers of activity, mostly either thick lava flows or steep-sided lava and pyroclastic domes.

Rock from a borehole 1,000 metres (3,300 ft) deep at Olkaria is around 450,000 years old, but the surface features are no more than 20,000 years old. The oldest exposed sequence is the Ol Njorowa pantellerite formation of pyroclastic rocks, lava flows, and plugs. This is thought to be related to a caldera 11 kilometres (6.8 mi) by 7.5 kilometres (4.7 mi) that later collapsed, indicated by traces of a ring fracture. The magma has a wide range of compositions, representing the different phases after the caldera collapsed. Although dating is not precise, it seems that the older rocks date to 9,000 years before present, while the youngest rocks in the Olobutot formation are between 130 and 230 years old.

== Geothermal potential ==
Olkaria lies within the Naivasha sub-basin, known for hot springs, hot grounds, and fumaroles. Further north, Lake Bogoria has steam jets and geysers with temperatures as high as 96 °C (205 °F). There are steam fumaroles at Njorowa Gorge in Olkaria. In the underground reservoirs, temperatures of 280 °C (536 °F) have been measured at nearby Eburru and 340 °C (644 °F) at Olkaria. The geothermal production zones at Olkaria are at depths of between 750 metres (2,460 ft) to 1,000 metres (3,300 ft), and further down at between 1,100 metres (3,600 ft) to 1,300 metres (4,300 ft) below the surface.

Underground water from Lake Naivasha may be feeding the geothermal reservoir at Olkaria, which has caused concern since the lake has been shrinking in size recently. However, the absence of tritium in the steam shows that the water is taking at least fifty years to travel from the lake, if that is indeed the source.

== Exploitation ==
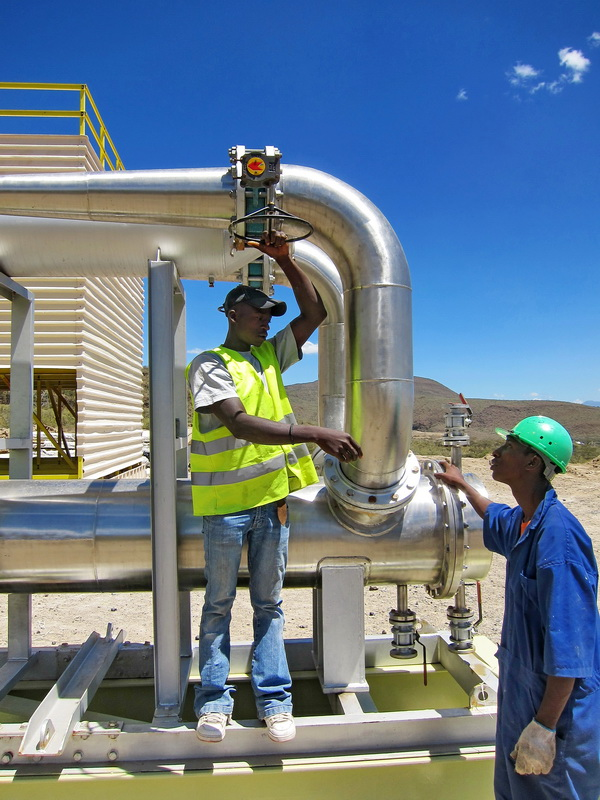
Power plant workers in Olkaria

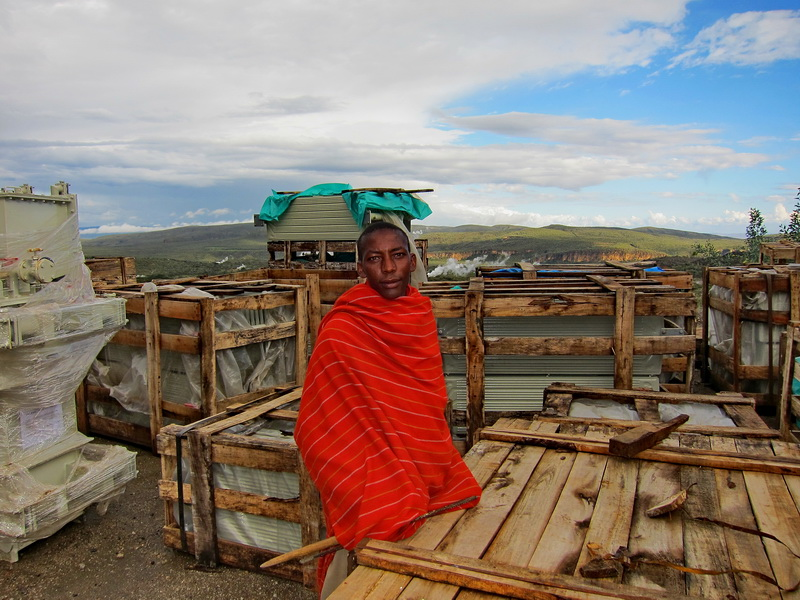
A Maasai man at Olkaria - some communities have been displaced by the power generation projects

The first geothermal exploration of Olkaria started in 1955. Two unsuccessful test wells had been drilled by 1959. Little more was done until 1967, when 27 shallow wells up to 61 metres (200 ft) were drilled, some of which emitted steam. Starting in 1970 the Kenya Power Company (now the Kenya Electricity Generating Company, or KenGen) and the United Nations Development Programme began systematic efforts to survey and then exploit the geothermal potential. Production wells were drilled and commercial generation of electricity started in July 1981 with a plant built by Mitsubishi Heavy Industries containing a 15 MW turbo-generator. A second 15 MW turbine came online in December 1982 and a third in March 1985, bringing total output up to 45 MW of which 3.3MW is used to power the station itself. Thirty production wells had been sunk by 1999 of which twenty-seven were productive, each yielding from 1.5 MW to 8 MW. Currently, 15 wells are being used to power the Olkaria I station.

Following rising power demands, a third station, Olkaria II was built with a production capacity of 105 MW with 5.2 MW used to power the station itself. It is powered by 3 Mitsubishi turbines, each capable of generating 35 MW. The steam is obtained from 22 wells, each producing an estimated 35 tonnes of steam per hour.

As of 2005, KenGen owned the Olkaria I (45 MW) and Olkaria II (70 MW) power plants. A third power station with 48 MW capacity, Olkaria III, is privately owned by a subsidiary of Ormat Technologies. The Olkaria III plant uses air-cooled converters, ensuring that there is no surface discharge. This new technology has the least impact on the environment of any power generated in Kenya. The project will probably qualify for carbon credits under the Kyoto Protocol's Clean Development Mechanism. In February 2010 Ormat announced plans to increase the capacity of their plant to as much as 100 MW.

In 2005 KenGen was planning to build a fourth plant. An environmental and social impact assessment was approved by the National Environmental Management Authority, including resettlement of some Maasai communities. In December 2010 the European Investment Bank recommended providing partial financing for a project to expand Olkaria I and build Olkaria IV, adding 280 MW to its capacity. KenGen estimates that the area has a total potential of 2,000 MW.

== See also ==
- Geothermal power in Kenya
