= Olkaria I Geothermal Power Station =

Power plant in Kenya

- Map of Kenya showing the location of Olkaria I Geothermal Power Station
- Country: Kenya
- Location: Olkaria, Nakuru County
- Coordinates: 0°53′35″S 36°18′32″E
- Status: Operational
- Commission date: 1981 (unit 1); 1982 (unit 2); 1985 (unit 3); 2014 (unit 4); 2015 (unit 5); 2022 (unit 6)
- Owner: KenGen
- Operator: Kenya Electricity Generating Company

Power generation
- Units operational: 3 x 15 MW; 2 x 70 MW; 1 x 83.3 MW
- Nameplate capacity: 268.3 megawatts (359,800 hp)

The Olkaria I Geothermal Power Station, also known as Olkaria I Geothermal Power Plant, is a geothermal power station in Kenya, with an installed capacity of 268.3 megawatts (359,800 hp).

== Location ==
The facility is located in the Hell's Gate National Park along with its sister stations, Olkaria II and Olkaria III. This location lies in Olkaria, in Nakuru County, on the eastern edge of the Eastern Rift Valley, approximately 40 kilometres (25 mi), by road, southwest of Naivasha, the nearest large town. Olkaria is approximately 121 kilometres (75 mi), by road, northwest of Nairobi.

== Overview ==
Olkaria I Geothermal Power Station is one in a series of six geothermal power stations, clustered in the Olkaria area in Nakuru County. Four of the stations Olkaria I, Olkaria II, Olkaria III and Olkaria IV were operational, as of September 2017. As of 2020, the entire Olkaria complex had an installed capacity of 810.3 MW Olkaria V was synchronised to the grid in 2019. and Olkaria VI is planned for 2021.

== History ==
The Olkaria I Power Station first started operation in 1981 running one Mitsubishi turbine with a generation capacity of 15 MW. In 1982 and 1985, two more turbines identical to the first were commissioned at the facility, bringing the total generation capacity to 45 MW. As of January 2015 unit 4 and 5 with a combined installed capacity of 140 Megawatts were inaugurated. This brings the total installed capacity of Olkaria I to 185 Megawatts.

In March 2016, the government of Kenya borrowed KSh9.53 billion (US$95 million), from the Japan International Cooperation Agency (JICA) to refurbish turbines 1, 2 and 3 at Olkaria I. The works includes increasing the combined capacity of the three turbines from 45 MW to 50.7 MW. The rehabilitation and upgrade works are expected to last until 2021. This will increase capacity at this power station from 185 MW to 190.7 MW.

In December 2018, Kenya Electricity Generating Company broke ground for the construction of Unit 6 of Olkaria I Geothermal Power Station, with capacity of 83 megawatts. Completion of this unit was expected in 2021, bringing total capacity at this geothermal station to 268.3 MW. Unit 6 of Olkaria I, was commercially commissioned in July 2022.

== Ownership ==
Olkaria I Power Station is owned by KenGen, a Nairobi Stock Exchange - listed company, in which the government of Kenya maintains a 70 percent shareholding, the remaining 30 percent being held by institutional and private investors.

== See also ==
- List of power stations in Kenya
- Geothermal power in Kenya
- Olkaria II Geothermal Power Station
- Olkaria III Geothermal Power Station
- Olkaria IV Geothermal Power Station
- Olkaria V Geothermal Power Station
