= Africa Renewable Energy Initiative =

The Africa Renewable Energy Initiative (AREI) is an African initiative to increase the use of renewable energy on the continent.

The goal of the program is to create integrated solutions that will enhance human well-being, expand access to clean energy services, and set African nations on the path to development that is both climate-friendly and sustainable.

AREI set a goal to install 10 GW of renewable energy by 2020 (Phase I - Successful) and at least 300 GW by 2030 when the Initiative was first introduced in 2015.

== History ==
The African Renewable Energy Initiative (AREI) is an initiative driven by Africa. The G7, led by Germany, first declared their support for the initiative at the 2015 Elmau summit. The G7, the European Commission, Sweden, and the Netherlands reaffirmed their support for the initiative during the 2015 Paris climate negotiations. They committed to providing a total of 10 billion US dollars through bilateral and multilateral initiatives in the period from 2015 to 2020 for the expansion of renewable energies. German Development Minister Gerd Müller announced that Germany would contribute three billion euros throughout the same timeframe, to be made through bilateral channels.

== Launch ==
Launched on December 1, 2015, during COP21 in Paris, France, by African Heads of State and Government, the Africa Renewable Energy Initiative (AREI) is a revolutionary endeavor led and owned by Africa that aims to utilize the continent's enormous renewable energy potential for sustainable development and universal energy access.

== Organizational Structure ==
The initiative functions under the structures of the African Union's commission, the New Partnership for Africa's Development (NEPAD), the African Group of Negotiators, the African Development Bank, the UN Environment Program (UNEP), and the International Renewable Energy Agency (IRENA).

== Goals ==
The overall goals of the Africa Renewable Energy Initiative are to:

• help achieve sustainable development, enhanced well-being, and sound economic development by ensuring universal access to sufficient amounts of clean, appropriate and affordable energy

• help African countries leapfrog to renewable energy systems that support their low-carbon development strategies while enhancing their economic and energy security

== Work Areas and Phases ==
The initiative has nine work areas that include mapping, promotion of transformative policies, capacity building, funding, and financing, in addition to safeguards and multi-stakeholder participation.

The AREI also outlines two phases: Phase 1 (2015–2019) with a target of enabling provision of 10 GW of new and additional renewable energy generation capacity, and Phase 2 (2020–2030) targeting 300 GW.

== Lead Partners / Organizations ==
- Guinea
- Egypt
- Namibia
- Chad
- Kenya
- Committee of African Heads of States on Climate Change (CAHOSCC)
- African Union Commission
- African Development Bank
- France
- European Union

== Potentials ==
1. Leapfrogging potential: AREI as a promising catalyst to face energy access and low-carbon challenges
2. AREI as a platform for enhanced pan-African cooperation
3. AREI as a promoter of people-centred energy policies
