= Olkaria III Geothermal Power Station =

Geothermal power station in Kenya

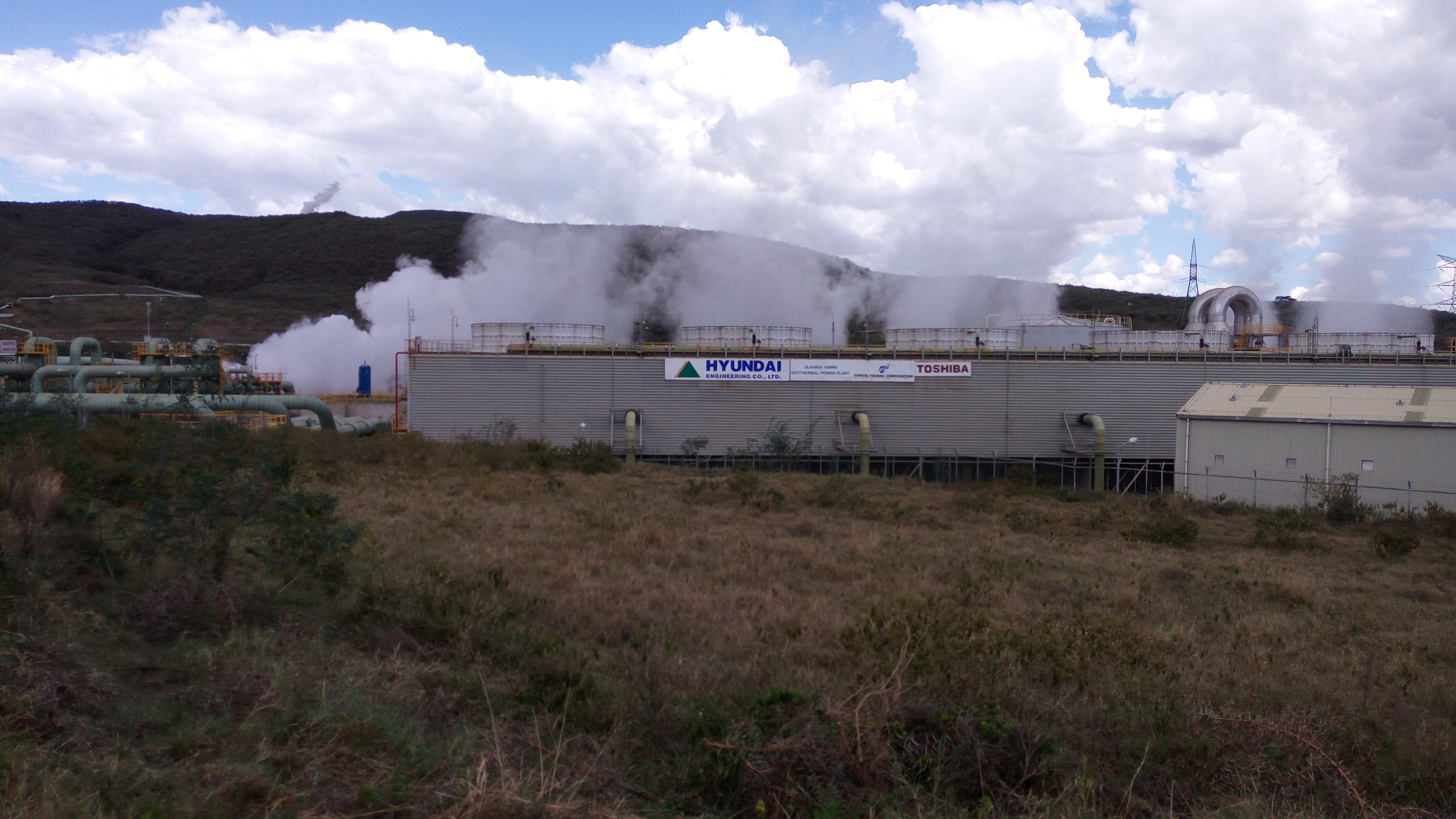
- Map of Kenya showing the location of Olkaria III Geothermal Power Station
- Country: Kenya
- Location: Olkaria, Nakuru County, Kenya
- Coordinates: 0°53′20″S 36°15′19″E
- Status: Operational
- Commission date: 2000, 2009, 2014, 2016 & 2018
- Owner: Ormat Technologies Inc.

Power generation
- Units operational: 1 x 48 MW; 1 x 36 MW; 1 x 26 MW; 1 x 29 MW; 1 x 11 MW
- Nameplate capacity: 150 MW

The Olkaria III Geothermal Power Station, is a large geothermal power plant in Kenya, having an installed electricity generating capacity of 150 MW.

== Location ==
The facility is located adjacent to Hell's Gate National Park, along with its sister stations, Olkaria I, Olkaria II, and Olkaria IV. This location lies in the Olkaria area, in Nakuru County, on the eastern edge of the Eastern Rift Valley, approximately 38 kilometres (24 mi), by road, southwest of Naivasha, the nearest large town. Olkaria lies approximately 126 kilometres (78 mi), by road, northwest of Nairobi. The geographical coordinates of Olkaria III Geothermal Power Station are 0°53'27.0"S, 36°17'21.0"E (Latitude:-0.890833; Longitude:36.289167).

== History ==
The Olkaria III Power Station first started operation in 2000, running one Ormat power plant with a generation capacity of 13 MW. In January 2009 new infrastructure was installed, adding another 35 MW to the plant's capacity. Later, another 36 MW production capacity was installed. The third generation unit at Olkaria III, with capacity of 26 MW was commissioned in 2014, bringing the total capacity at the plant to 110 MW. The fourth generation unit, with capacity of 26 MW was commissioned in 2016, bringing total capacity at the plant to 139 MW. In 2018 another 11 megawatts of capacity was added increasing generation capacity to 150 MW.

== Ownership ==
Olkaria III Power Station is owned and operated by Ormat Technologies Inc., a Reno, Nevada registered company, with production facilities in Yavne, Israel. Ormat Technologies owns the power station through its 100 percent subsidiary "OrPower 4 Inc". According to Kenyan print media, Ormat Technologies Inc. sold 503 gigawatt hours (GWh) to Kenya Power and Lighting Company, earning KES:3.89 billion (US$45 million), in the 12 months ending 30 June 2013.

== See also ==
- List of power stations in Kenya
- Geothermal power in Kenya
- Olkaria I Geothermal Power Station
- Olkaria II Geothermal Power Station
- Olkaria IV Geothermal Power Station
- Olkaria V Geothermal Power Station
