= Hell's Gate National Park =

National park in Kenya

- Hifadhi ya Taifa ya Lango la Jehanamu
- IUCN category II (national park)
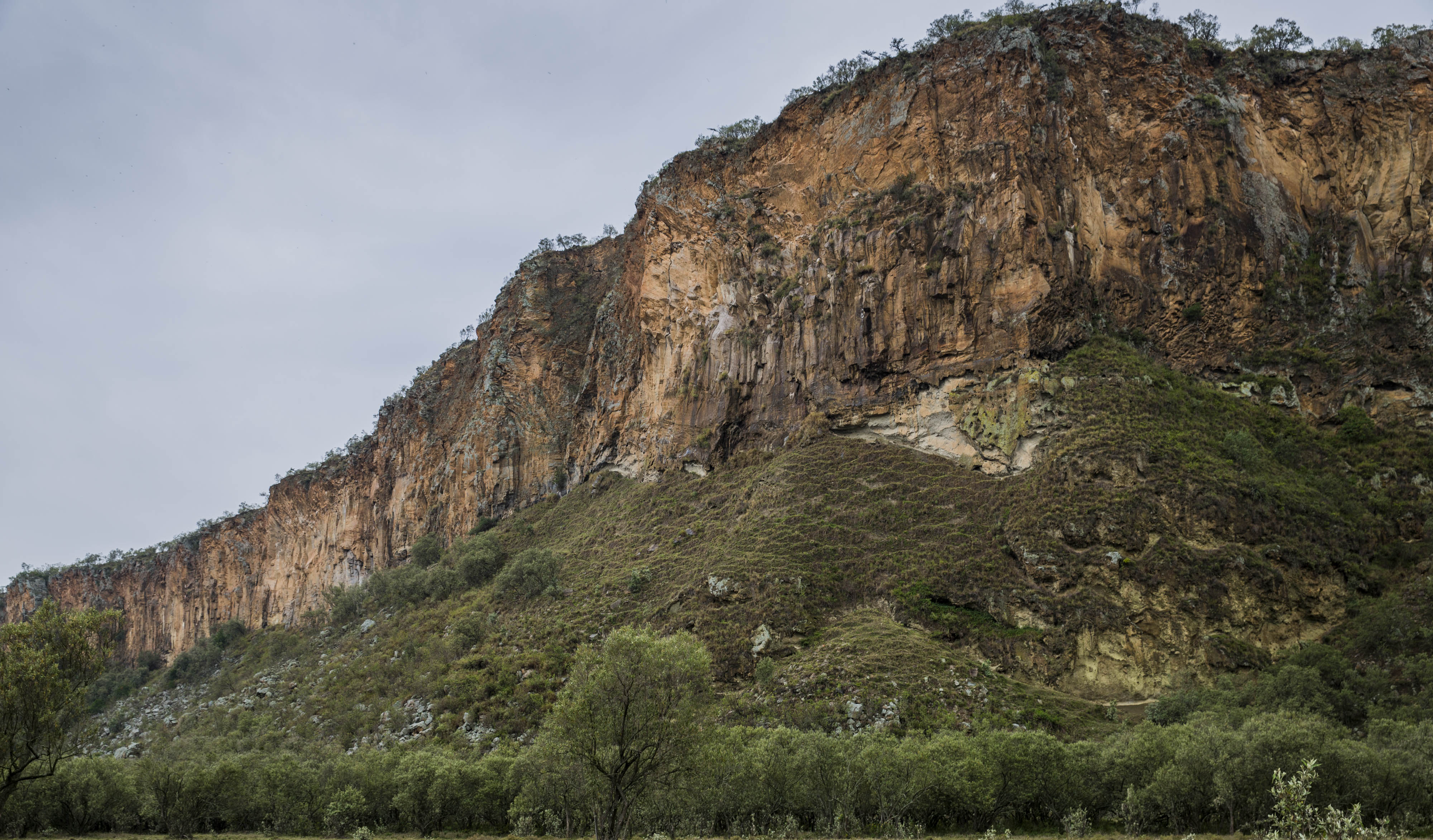
- Hell's Gate National Park, December 2014

- Location within Kenya
- Location: Rift Valley Province, Kenya
- Nearest city: Nakuru
- Coordinates: 0°54′57″S 36°18′48″E
- Area: 68.25 km^{2} (26.35 sq mi)
- Established: 1984
- Governing body: Kenya Wildlife Service

Hell's Gate National Park is a national park situated near Lake Naivasha in Kenya. The park is named after a narrow break in the cliffs, once a tributary of a prehistoric lake that fed early humans in the Rift Valley. It was established in 1984. The park is notable for its wide variety of wildlife and for its scenery. This includes the Fischer's Tower and Central Tower columns and Hell's Gate Gorge. The national park is also home to five geothermal power stations at Olkaria. The park features three basic campsites and includes a Maasai Cultural Center, providing education about the Maasai culture and traditions.

== History ==
Hell's Gate National Park is named after a narrow break in the cliffs, once a tributary of a prehistoric lake that fed early humans in the Rift Valley. It received the name "Hell's Gate" by explorers Gustav Fischer of Germany and Joseph Thomson of Britain during their rival expeditions in 1883.

In the early 1900s, Mount Longonot erupted, and ash can still be felt around Hell's Gate.

== Geography ==
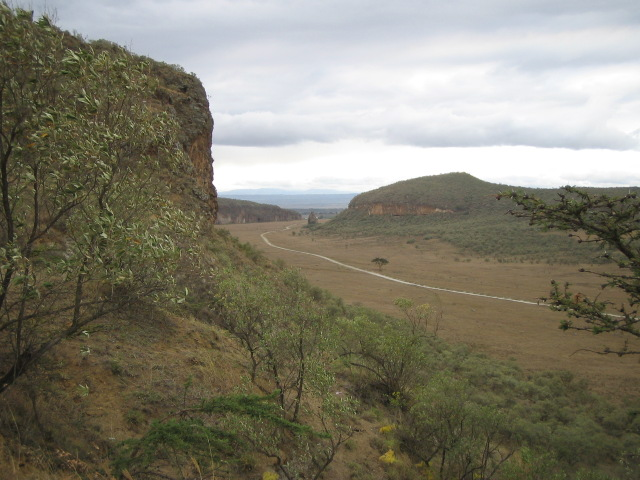

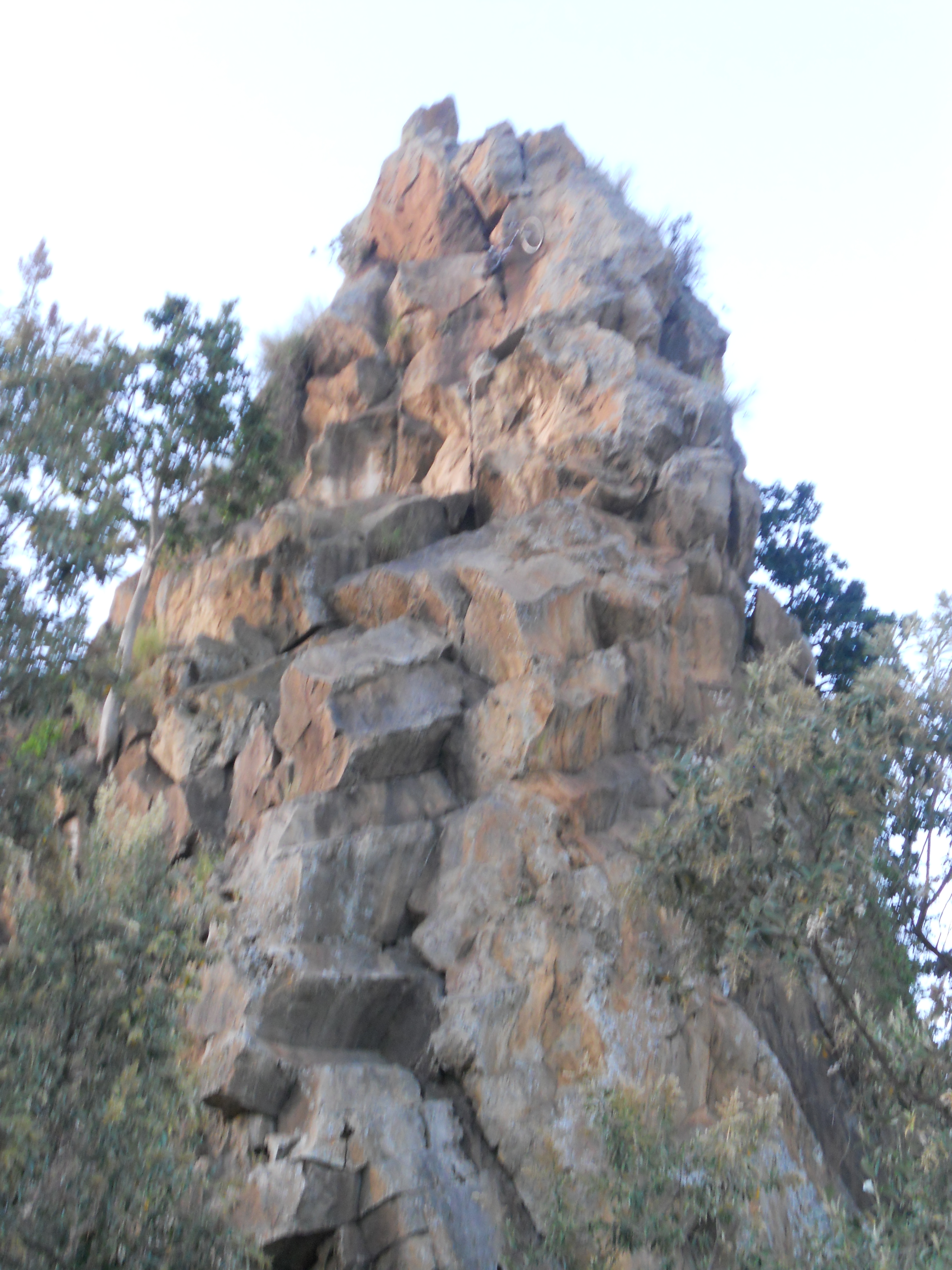
Fischer's Tower, named after Gustav Fischer, a German explorer who reached the gorge in 1882.

Hell's Gate covers an area of 68.25 square kilometres (26 mi^{2}). The park is at 1,900 metres (6,200 ft) above sea level. It is within Nakuru County, near Lake Naivasha and approximately 90 kilometres (56 mi) from Nairobi. The park is located 14 kilometres (9 mi) after the turnoff from the old Nairobi-Naivasha highway, and has a warm and dry climate. Olkaria and Hobley's, two extinct volcanoes located in the park, can be seen as well as obsidian forms from the cool molten lava. Within Hell's Gate is the Hells Gate Gorge, lined with red cliffs which contain two volcanic plugs: Fischer's Tower and Central Tower. Off of Central Tower is a smaller gorge which extends to the south, with a path that descends into hot springs that have rocks hot enough to cause burns, and sulfuric water.

== Wildlife ==
Wildlife in the national park includes lions, leopards, and cheetahs. However, the park has historically been an important home for the rare bearded vultures. There are over 103 species of birds in the park, including vultures, Verreaux's eagles, augur buzzards, and swifts. Hyraxes, African buffaloes, zebras, elands, hartebeests, Thomson's gazelles, hyenas, and baboons are also common. The park is also home to serval and small numbers of klipspringer antelope and Chanler's mountain reedbuck.

== Tourism ==
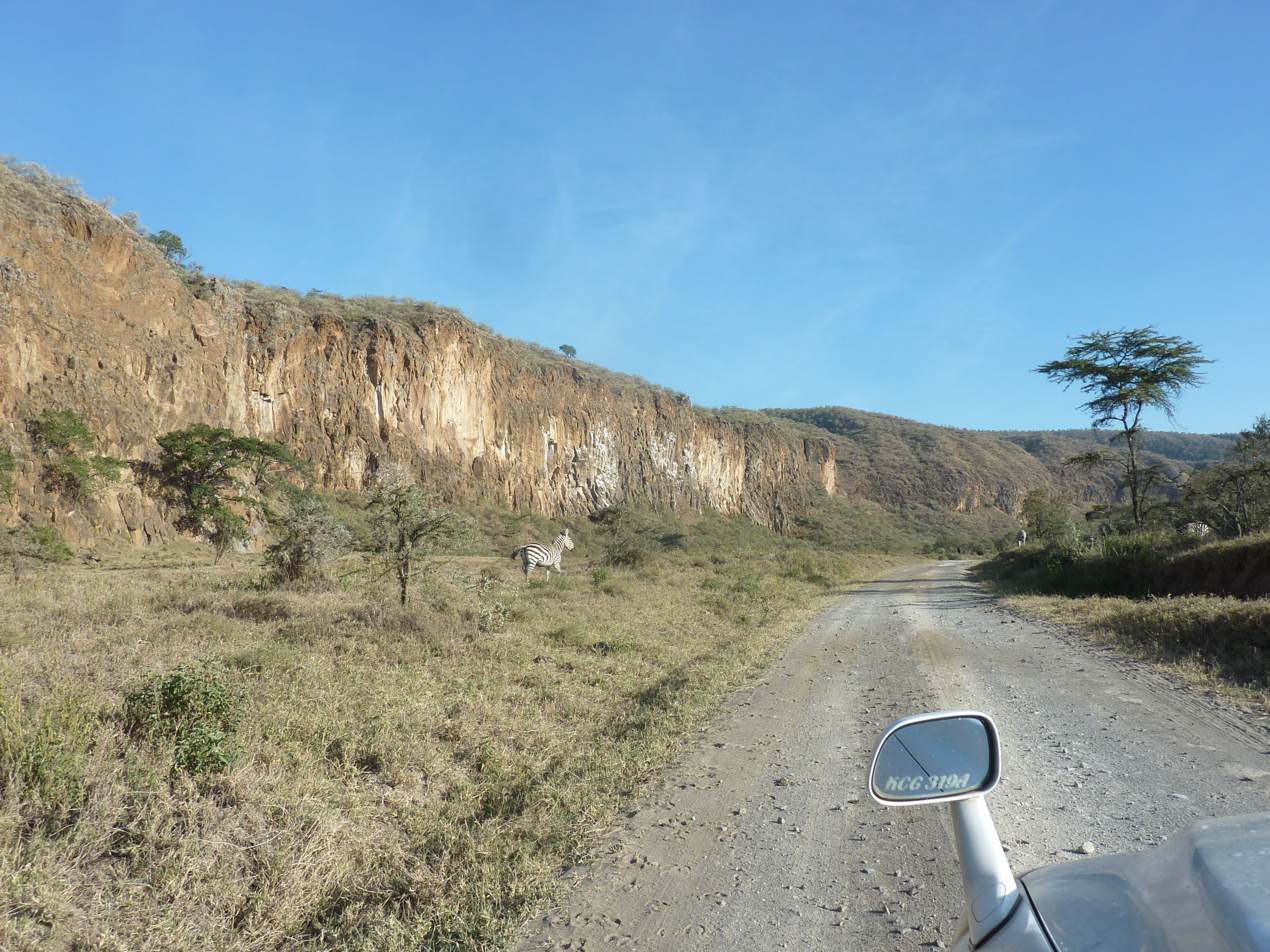
Tourist safari road

The park is popular due to its close proximity to Nairobi and lowered park fees compared to other national parks. Hiking, cycling, motorcycling and even camping are encouraged within the park, one of only two Kenyan national parks where this is allowed. The Daily Nation praised the mountain climbing in Hell's Gate as "thrilling". It also recommended the Joy Adamson's Centre and boating on Lake Naivasha. A Maasai Cultural Centre provides education about the Maasai tribe's culture and traditions.

The park is equipped with three basic campsites; camping is safe in the park, even though there are no guns or fencing between you and wildlife. There are also several lodges around Naivasha Lake, popular among tourists for water sports, bird and game viewing in private ranches and walks along Crescent Island, Crater Lake, and Mt. Longonot.

The main setting of the 1994 animated film The Lion King is heavily modeled after the park, which several of the film's lead crew members had visited to study and gain an appreciation of the environment for the film.

The 2003 film Lara Croft: Tomb Raider – The Cradle of Life was shot on location in this park.

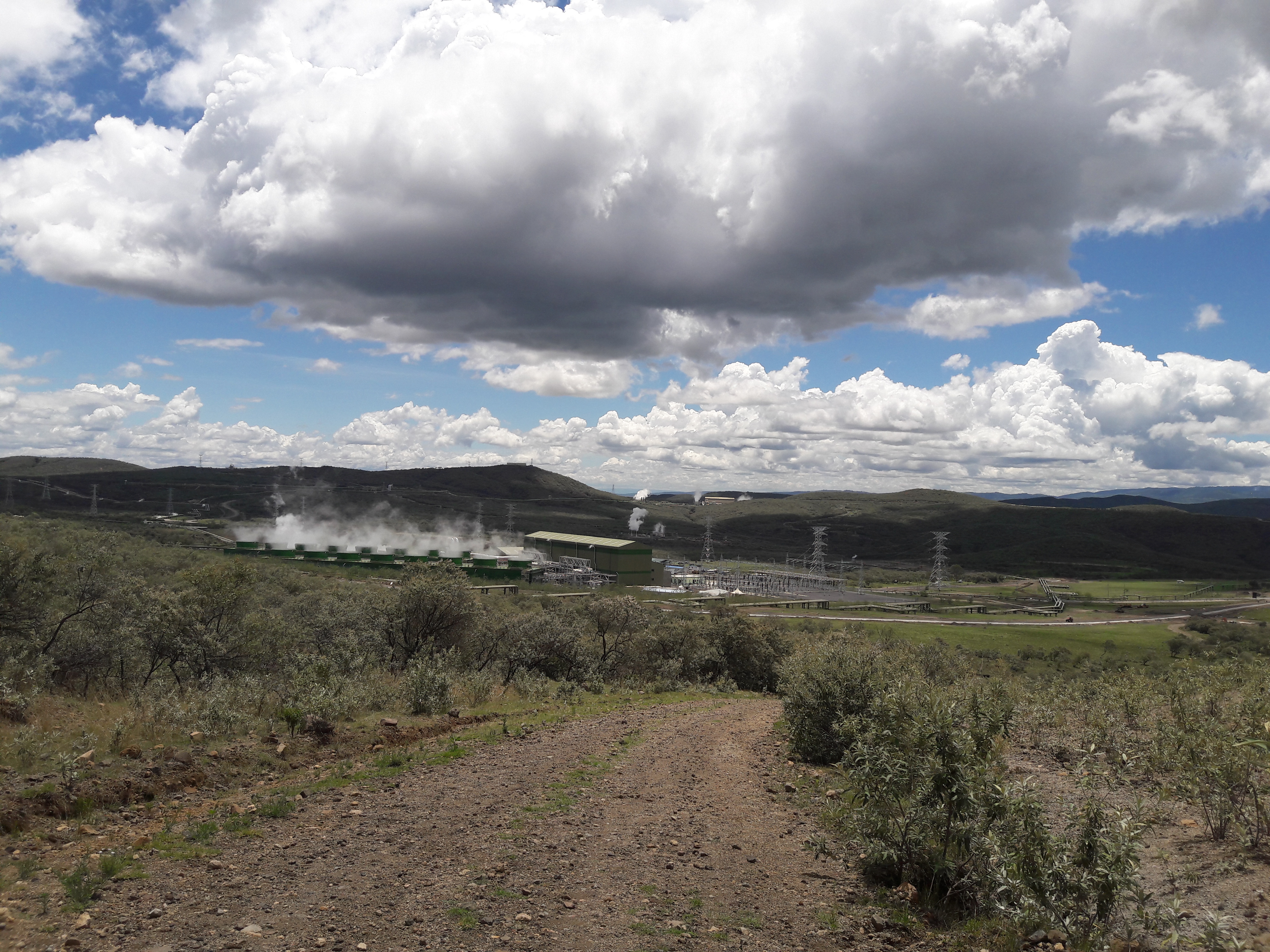
Olkaria V Geothermal Power Station

== Olkaria Geothermal Power Station ==
The comprehensive Olkaria Geothermal Station, the first of its kind in Africa, was established in 1981 and generates geothermal power underneath Hell's Gate from the area's hot springs and geysers. Three more geothermal stations were added after 2000: Olkaria II, Olkaria III and Olkaria IV. The construction of the 140MW Olkaria V commenced in 2017 and the plant came online in 2019. As of 2019, a significant part of the Hell's Gate National Park has turned into an industrial area, with many pipelines, power plants and busy tarmac roads.
