= Olkaria II Geothermal Power Station =

Power plant in Kenya

- Map of Kenya showing the location of Olkaria II Geothermal Power Station
- Country: Kenya
- Location: Olkaria, Nakuru County, Kenya
- Coordinates: 0°51′51″S 36°17′58″E
- Status: Operational
- Commission date: 2003 and 2010
- Owner: KenGen
- Operator: Kenya Electricity Generating Company

Power generation
- Units operational: 3 (@ 35MW)
- Nameplate capacity: 105 megawatts (141,000 hp)

The Olkaria II Geothermal Power Station also known as Olkaria II Geothermal Power Plant is a geothermal power plant in Kenya, with installed electric generating capacity of 105 megawatts (141,000 hp)

== Location ==
The facility is located in the Olkaria area, adjacent to Hell's Gate National Park, on the eastern edge of the Eastern Rift Valley, approximately 113 kilometres (70 mi), southeast of the city of Nakuru, where the county headquarters re located. Olkaria lies approximately 122 kilometres (76 mi), by road, northwest of Nairobi. The coordinates of Olkaria are:0°51'49.0"S, 36°18'00.0"E (Latitude:-0.8636; Longitude:36.3000).

== History ==
Olkaria II went on-stream in 2003 when Kenya Electricity Generating Company (KenGen) commissioned two 35 MW units manufactured and installed by Mitsubishi Heavy Industries (MHI). In 2010, a third unit of 35 MW capacity was installed, at a cost of approximately US$100 million, bringing the total capacity to 105 Megawatts. The expansion was financed by (a) the European Investment Bank, which lent US$40.8 million (KSh303 billion), the International Development Association, which lent US$27.6 million (KSh2.2 billion), the French Development Agency, which lent US$20 million (KSh1.6 billion) and KenGen, which contributed the balance. The Olkaria II power plant is one of six geothermal stations either planned or already operational in the Olkaria area in Nakuru County.

== Ownership ==
Olkaria II Power Station is owned by KenGen, a public company, whose stock is traded on the Nairobi Stock Exchange, and in which the government of Kenya maintains 70 percent shareholding, the remaining 30 percent being held by private individual and institutional investors.

== See also ==
- List of power stations in Kenya
- Geothermal power in Kenya
- Olkaria I Geothermal Power Station
- Olkaria III Geothermal Power Station
- Olkaria IV Geothermal Power Station
- Olkaria V Geothermal Power Station
