= Kenya Electricity Generating Company =

State-owned electric power production company

Kenya Electricity Generating Company PLC
- Trade name: KenGen PLC
- Type: Public Liability Company
- Traded as: KN: KEGN
- Industry: Electric power
- Founded: 1 February 1954; 72 years ago
- Founder: Government of Kenya
- Headquarters: Nairobi, Kenya
- Area served: Kenya
- Key people: Julius Migos Ogamba, Chairman of the Board of Directors; Eng. Peter Njenga, Managing Director and Chief Executive Officer
- Revenue: KSh.44.110 billion/= (30 June 2020)
- Net income: KSh.18.377 billion/= (30 June 2020)
- Total assets: KSh.412.927 billion/= (30 June 2020)
- Total equity: KSh.211.318/= (30 June 2020)
- Owner: Government of Kenya
- Number of employees: 2,600 (17 November 2023)
- Website: http://www.kengen.co.ke/

Kenya Electricity Generating Company PLC abbreviated to KenGen, is a government enterprise in the Republic of Kenya charged with the production of electricity for the country. KenGen is the largest electric power producer in Kenya, generating over 60% of the electricity consumed in the country.

== Overview ==
KenGen relies on various sources to generate electricity, ranging from hydropower, geothermal, thermal and wind, with hydropower being the leading source of electricity.

The company owns 30 hydropower plants with a combined capacity of 825.69 MW, four thermal power plants generating 256 MW, seven geothermal power plants with a generating capacity of 713.13 MW and one Wind power plant at Ngong producing 26 MW, for a combined generating capacity of 1,817.82 MW.

Presently KenGen operates five major geothermal power plants with 12 installed units, namely: Olkaria I, Olkaria II, Olkaria I additional units 4, 5 and 6, Olkaria IV, Olkaria V. 16 wellhead plants with 21 installed units.

The Olkaria geothermal power stations are located in Nakuru County within the Hell's Gate National Park bordering Lake Naivasha within the Great Rift Valley.

== History ==
The company was founded on 1 February 1954 as the Kenya Power Company (KPC) and was commissioned to construct the transmission line between Nairobi and Tororo in Uganda. This was to transmit power generated at the Owen Falls Dam to Kenya. KPC was also tasked to develop electricity generating facilities in the country.

KPC was managed by the Kenya Power and Lighting Company under a management contract. In January 1997, the management of KPC was formally separated from Kenya Power as a direct result of reforms being undertaken in the energy sector and the entire economy. Subsequently, on 19 January 1998 the company changed its name from Kenya Power Company to Kenya Electricity Generating Company. The trading name KenGen PLC was also adopted at this point.

In 2006, KenGen was listed on the Nairobi Securities Exchange after the Government of Kenya sold 30 percent of its stake in the company through a successful initial public offering that received over 280,000 applications.

== Ownership ==
KenGen currently has 6,594,522,339 shares. The shares of Kenya Electricity Generating Company are publicly listed on the NSE, where it trades under the symbol: KEGN

Kenya Electricity Generating Company Stock Ownership
Rank	Name of Owner	Percentage Ownership
1	Government of Kenya	70.00
2	Others	30.00
	Total	100.00

== List of power stations and installed capacity ==
See also List of power stations in Kenya

=== Current capacity ===
The current capacity of KenGen's power stations are;

==== Hydroelectric ====
- Gitaru Hydro Power Plant – 225 MW
- Gogo Hydro Power Plant – 2 MW, on the Gucha River
- Kamburu Hydro Power Plant – 93
- Kiambere Hydro Power Plant – 169 MW
- Kindaruma Hydroelectric Power Station – 72 MW
- Masinga Hydroelectric Power Station – 40 MW
- Mesco Hydro Power Plant – 0.43 MW
- Sagana Hydro Power Plant – 1.5 MW
- Sondu Miriu Hydroelectric Power Station – 60 MW
- Sosiani Hydro Power Plant – 0.4 MW
- Tana Hydroelectric Power Station – 20 MW
- Turkwel Hydro Power Plant – 106 MW
- Wanjii Hydroelectric Power Station – 7.4 MW

==== Geothermal ====
- Olkaria I Geothermal Power Plant - 45 MW
- Olkaria II Geothermal Power Plant - 105 MW
- Olkaria I AU Geothermal Power Station - 223 MW
- Olkaria V Geothermal Plant- 172MW
- Eburru Geothermal Power Plant – 2.44 MW
- Wellhead Geothermal Power Plant (Olkaria)- 5.0 MW
- Wellhead Generation – 81 MW

==== Thermal ====
- Kipevu I Diesel – 60 MW
- Kipevu III Diesel – 115 MW
- Muhoroni Gas Turbine - 55 MW

==== Wind ====
- Ngong Hills Wind Power Station: Phase I – 5.1 MW
- Ngong Hills Wind Power Station: Phase II – 20.4 MW

=== Future projects ===
KenGen plans to increase it installed capacity to 721 megawatts by 2025.

==== Geothermal ====
- Olkaria I Unit 6 – 83 MW – Completed Year: 2022
- Eburru Project – 25 MW – Completion Year: 2016
- Olkaria VI – 140 MW – Completion Year: 2016/17
- Olkaria VII – 140 MW – Completion Year: 2018
- Olkaria VIII – 140 MW – Completion Year: 2018

==== Wind ====
- Wind Power Station: Phase II – 300 MW – Completion Year: 2020
- Marsabit Wind Power Plant – 200 MW – Will Begin Construction In 2026

== Lists ==
- Electricity by country
  - List of countries by electricity production
  - List of countries by electricity consumption
