= Menengai Geothermal Power Station =

Menengai Geothermal Power Station may refer to any of the following:

- Menengai I Geothermal Power Station, a geothermal power station in Menengai Crater, Kenya; owned by Orpower Twenty Two Limited.
- Menengai II Geothermal Power Station, a geothermal power station in Menengai Crater, Kenya; owned by Quantum Power East Africa
- Menengai III Geothermal Power Station, a geothermal power station in Menengai Crater, Kenya; owned by Sosian Energy
