= Wind power in Kenya =

Despite its high potential for wind energy generation, wind power in Kenya currently contributes only about 16 percent of the country's total electrical power. However, its share in energy production is increasing. Kenya Vision 2030 aims to generate 2,036 MW of wind power (9% of the expected total maximum generation capacity) by 2030. To accomplish this goal, Kenya is developing numerous wind power generation centers and continues to rely on the nation's three major wind farms: the Lake Turkana Wind Power Station, the Kipeto Wind Power Station, and the Ngong Hills Wind Farm. While these wind power stations are beneficial to help offset fossil fuel usage and increase overall energy supply reliability in Kenya, project developments have also negatively impacted some indigenous communities and the parts of the environment surrounding the wind farms.

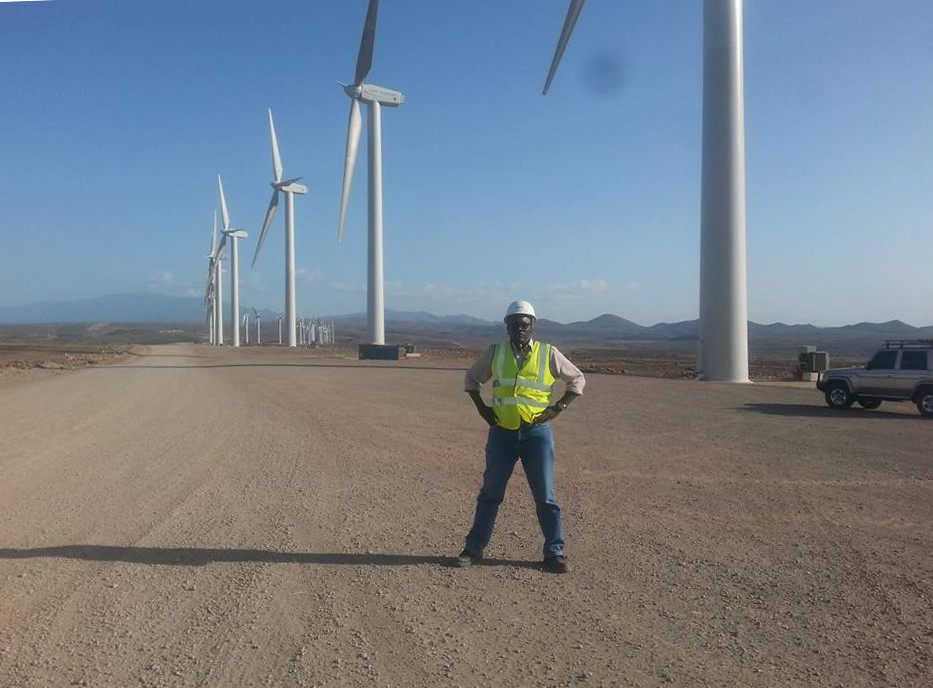
Wind turbines in Sarima Kenya

== History and growth ==
Kenya has historically relied on imported crude oil and natural gas from nations such as the United Arab Emirates to provide electricity. Over the past two decades the nation is gradually reducing its reliance on fossil fuels through investments in renewable energy such as wind, solar, geothermal, and hydro powers (source of renewable energy which uses the natural flow of moving water to generate electricity).

Wind power has provided the nation with the ability to remove reliance on fossil fuels since the early 2000s. The first wind farm in Kenya appeared in early 2000 in Ngong Hills with a capacity of 0.4 MW by the Kenya Electricity Generating Company (KenGen). In 2011, the grid installed capacity of wind power was increased to 5.3 MW, and in 2015, to 25.5 MW. Because of this power plant, the contribution of wind power generation as a national source of energy in 2017 was 1.09% (25.5 MW).

The share of non-fossil energy in the Kenyan energy system increased by 90% between 2010 and 2018, with wind and solar energy accounting for 3% of this share. There is a projected increase in renewables (solar and wind) contribution to about 18.5% of the total national grid mix by 2030.

Electricity demand in Kenya has had a steady growth rate of around 5.6% annually, and is projected to reach 5,780 MW in 2030.

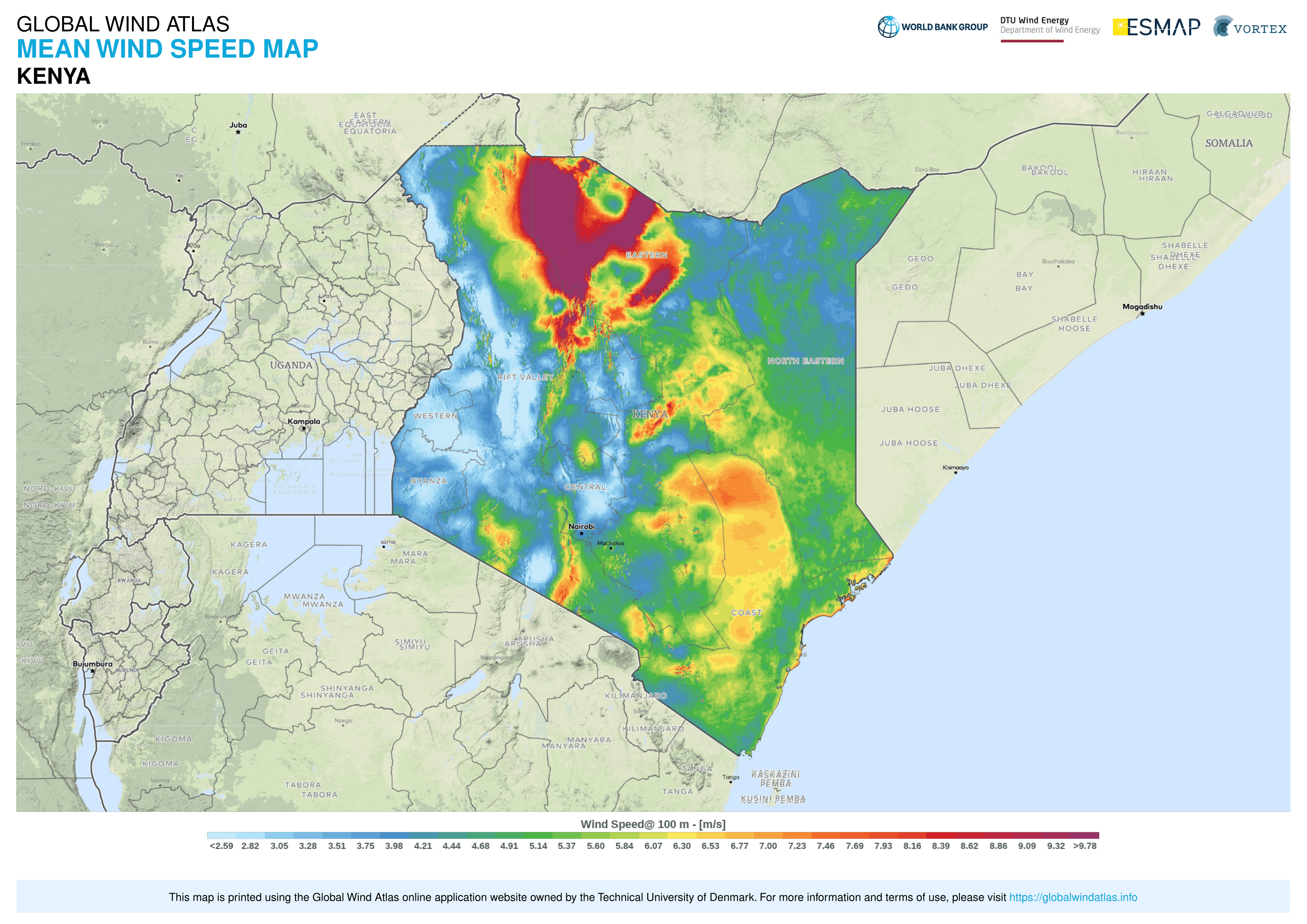
Mean wind speed in Kenya

== Wind resources ==
Kenya resides in the equatorial zone, a subsection of the tropics known to provide substantial wind and solar energy resources. Areas in the Rift Valley, such as the Marsabit and Turkana counties, enjoy the best wind speeds of the country and are highly utilized in wind based electrical production.

When compared with the rest of Africa, Kenya ranks among the top in potential for wind energy as it has an above average land wind speed range of 3.26-8.11 m/s compared to the global average land wind speed of 3.28 m/s at 10 meters. Kenya has the potential for wind capacity at 346 W/m2. Kenya utilizes this natural resource to produce up to 16% of the nation's energy.

=== Lake Turkana ===
The Lake Turkana Wind Power Station, Kenya's largest wind farm, utilizes the Turkana Channel jet for its wind power productions. Wind from this low level jet blows year round, but has a variation in strength across the day, partly due to mountain-valley temperature variations.

== Green energy goals ==
=== Policies and politics ===
- 2006: Kenya's Energy Act of 2006 creates the Energy Regulatory Commission (ERC) and the Rural Electrification Authority (REA). Both authorities oversee the Kenyan energy sector Through subsidizing rural energy (REA) and regulating the renewable and petroleum sectors (ERC).
- 2008: The Kenya Vision 2030 project is announced with the goal of generating 23,000 MW of power through renewable sources such as wind, geothermal, hydropower, and solar by 2030.
- 2009: The ERC creates the Least Cost Power Development Planning Committee (LCPDP) as a stakeholder in renewable energy legislation and decisions. The LCPDP collaborated on the Kenya Vision 2030 project to on a goal of creating 2,036 MW of wind power by 2030.
- 2013: Kenyan government launches a program to install infrastructure capable of generating 5000+ MW of power over 40 months. By 2015, the original goal and the program itself was scaled back.
- 2015: The African Union at COP21 launches the Africa Renewable Energy Initiative (AREI) to strengthen policy and incentive frameworks surrounding the growth of energy sectors in African nations such as Kenya. The AREI emphasizes the promotion of renewable energy, especially wind power.
- 2019: The Energy Act replaces the ERC with the Energy and Petroleum Regulatory Authority (ERPA) and assigns governmental regulatory bodies to oversee supply, use, and production of energy.
- 2021: The Kenyan government released the Renewable Energy Auction Policy which will allow for competitive bidding and pricing for future renewable energy generation projects above 20 MW as long as they are not geothermal in nature.

== Current projects ==
=== Lake Turkana Wind Power Station ===
Kenya's Lake Turkana Wind Power Station (LTWP) in Marsabit County is Africa's largest wind farm to date. The project was conceived in 2005 through a collaboration of Anset Africa Limited and KP&P and was completed in 2017 after three years of construction. At a cost of US$700 million, it is the largest single private investment project in Kenya's history.

The LTWP was commissioned to aid Kenya in reaching its sustainability goal of consuming 100% green energy by 2030. The LTWP aims to reduce usage of fossil fuels and greenhouse gas emissions by reducing thermal power generation and diverting energy generation to renewable sources such as wind.

The LTWP generates 310 megawatts (MW) of wind power capacity to Kenya's national grid through the 365 44-meter wide turbines and 436 km of transmission lines installed during construction. The energy generated by the LTWP provides 15-17% of Kenya's installed energy capacity and offsets 736,615 tons of carbon dioxide annually. The 310 MW of wind energy produced will also:

- increase national electricity supply by 15–20% (relative to 2015 generating capacity)
- enhance reliability of energy supply
- stabilize energy prices
- create more than 2,000 local jobs including 150 permanent jobs
- mitigate human health impacts from harmful air pollutants
- improve access to food, health facilities, and water through corporate social responsibility programs
- increase income generating opportunities
- improve local education

=== Kipeto Wind Power Station ===
The Kipeto Wind Power Station is the second largest wind farm in Kenya, located in Kajiado County. Its 60 General Electric turbines provide 102 MW of power to Kenya's power grid, supporting 250,000 households. The power station advances the Kenya Vision 2030 objective: to modernize their power grid and achieve universal access to electricity by 2030.

The Kipeto project is owned by the Kipeto Energy PLC (KEP), a special purpose vehicle created specifically for the Kipeto project. BTE Renewables, a shareholder of KEP, was supported by Power Africa, a U.S. government partnership of organizations to expand renewable energy access in Africa. The project reached financial close at the end of 2018, and began operations in July 2021. To mitigate construction delays due to COVID-19, Power Africa supported the Kipeto project in its recovery of power and energy demand after the lifting of lockdown measures.

=== Ngong Hills Wind Farm ===
Ngong Hills Wind Farm is situated roughly 35 kilometers (22 mi) southwest of Nairobi. Producing 25.5 MW of electricity, and with plans of increasing the capacity by an additional 10 MW, Ngong Hills Wind Farm was Kenya's first wind farm to be commissioned. Ngong Hills Wind Farm is also recognized as the first wind farm in East Africa with construction being completed in 1993 with the help of Belgium collaboration. In 2013, Kenya Electricity Generating Company, (KenGen) which owns and operates the wind farm and power station began adding new turbines, which have since generated more electricity for the country.

=== Wind power facilities in Kenya ===
Operational

Plant	Capacity (MW)	Status
Lake Turkana Wind Power Station	310	Commissioned 2019
Kipeto Wind Power Station	102	Commissioned 2021
Mombasa Cement Wind Power Station	36	Commissioned 2019
Ngong Hills Wind Farm	25.5	Commissioned 1993

Planned

Plant	Capacity (MW)	Status
Meru Wind Power Station	400	On hold
Bubisa Wind Power Station	300	Under development
Lamu Wind Power Station	90	On hold
Bahari Wind Farm	90	Under development
Chania Green Generation	50	Under development
Limuru Wind Farm	50	Announced
Ol-Ndanyat Wind Power Project	30	Under development

== Challenges and impacts ==
=== Indigenous community impact ===
The construction of wind farms has negatively impacted some local indigenous communities. The failure to recognize and respect indigenous peoples' rights is a violation of international law, and failure to conduct local consultation can lead to serious legal ramifications for green energy projects.

In 2015, plaintiffs representing the pastoralist communities of El Molo, Turkana, Samburu, and Rendille presented the consequences of the Lake Turkana Wind Power project, including housing displacement, environmental degradation, and social inequality. As ruled in 2021 by the Kenyan Environment and Land Court in Meru, the deeds for acquisition of the land for the LTWP was considered "irregular, unlawful and unconstitutional" and infringed on the rights of the communities living there. While the LTWP finalized project was not nullified, Marsabit County was given one year to correct the process before the land would be returned to the community.

=== Environmental impact ===
Strategic environmental impact-assessment studies (SEIAS) are being implemented for all Kenyan wind power projects to monitor how these projects are affecting their surrounding environments. Power Africa and USAID Kenya created a Biodiversity Action Plan (BAP) to help understand the impact wind farms will have on "critically endangered" raptors in the Kajiado County, where the Kipeto Wind Power Station is located. Utilizing these assessments will aid in the creation of mitigation efforts and conservation measures for the Rüppell's vulture and the white-backed vulture, which were needed to secure environmental approvals for project oversight.

Negative social and environmental impacts have also been highlighted in Environmental and Social Impact Assessments (ESIA) for the Lake Turkana Wind Power Station. According to an updated ESIA summary from 2011, some potential negative impacts include increased fire risks, soil erosion, air pollution, and terrestrial habitat alteration. Trees and brush needed to be cut down to make room for construction and be used as fuel wood and building materials. In an area where vegetation was already "very scarce", the alteration of local flora would lead to "an unbalanced use of vegetation by livestock, thus causing overgrazing and degradation of the environment". Mitigation plans, such as implementing a revegetation plan to repopulate disturbed areas with native plant species and saplings, were implemented to address these issues.

== See also ==
- Energy in Kenya
- Geothermal power in Kenya
- Hydroelectric power in Kenya
- List of power stations in Kenya
- Renewable energy in Kenya
- Renewable energy by country
