= Eldoret Solar Power Station =

Eldoret Solar Power station may refer to any of the following:

- Alten Solar Power Station: Located 12 kilometers south-east of Eldoret. Capacity 40 megawatts
- Eldosol Solar Power Station: Located 13 kilometers south-east of Eldoret. Capacity 40 megawatts
- Radiant Solar Power Station: Located 13 kilometers south-east of Eldoret. Capacity 40 megawatts
