= Alten Solar Power Station =

Solar farm in Kenya

- Official name: Kesses 1 Solar Power Station
- Country: Kenya
- Location: Eldoret, Uasin Gishu County
- Coordinates: 00°24′47″N 35°24′04″E
- Status: Operational
- Construction began: January 2020
- Commission date: June 2023
- Construction cost: US$87 million
- Owner: Alten Energías Renovables of Spain
- Operator: Alten Kenya Solarfarms BV

Solar farm
- Type: Flat-panel PV
- Site area: 10 hectares (25 acres)

Power generation
- Nameplate capacity: 44 megawatts (59,000 hp)
- Annual net output: 123 GWh

Alten Solar Power Station, also Kesses 1 Solar Power Station, is a 44 megawatts (59,000 hp) solar power plant in Kenya, the largest economy in the East African Community.

== Location ==
The power station is located outside the city of Eldoret, in Uasin Gishu County, approximately 312 kilometres (194 mi), by road, north-west of Nairobi, the capital and largest city in Kenya. The solar farm will sit on approximately 10 hectares (25 acres) of former farmland, approximately 12 kilometres (7 mi), south-east of Eldoret and about one kilometer east of Eldosol Solar Power Station and Radiant Solar Power Station.

== Overview ==
Kenya has ambitions to electrify 100 percent of the country's population, up from 70 percent in 2017. This development and the 50 megawatt Kopere Solar Power Station, together with the 55 megawatt Garissa Solar Power Station, owned by Kenya Rural Electrification Authority, are aimed to diversify Kenya electricity sources, given the unpredictability of hydro-power in this East African country. This power station is expected to supply 123 GWh of energy annually, enough to meet the energy needs of over 245,000 Kenyan homes.

== Developers ==
The power station is owned by Alten Energías Renovables (Alten Renewable Energy), a European independent power producer with two other solar project developments in Kenya, Kesses 2 and Kopere.

Alten notified Kenyan authorities that the French company Voltalia was selected by the owners to carry out the construction as the engineering, procurement and construction (EPC) contractor, as well as the operations and maintenance (O&M) contractor for the plant. The power is sold to electricity distributor Kenya Power and Lighting Company via a 20-year power purchase agreement (PPA).

== Funding ==
Standard Bank of South Africa, Stanbic Bank of Kenya and CIB Bank jointly provided a syndicated loan of US$41 million. The Emerging Africa Infrastructure Fund (EAIF) of the United Kingdom lent US$35 million towards his project.

== Transmission ==
The 230kV high voltage transmission line between Turkwel Hydroelectric Power Station and the Kenya Power substation at Lessos, passes over this solar farm. The power generated at this solar farm will be injected into the Kenyan grid at the point where that 230kV line crosses the solar farm.

== Construction timeline ==
Construction started in January 2020, with commissioning expected in late 2021 or early 2022. In September 2022, Afrik21.africa reported that the installation of the power station hardware was complete. After the mandatory performance tests and calibrations, the solar farm was expected to come online during the fourth quarter of 2022. The solar farm was commercially commissioned with a capacity of 44 MW in June 2023.

== See also ==
- List of power stations in Kenya
- Eldosol Solar Power Station
- Radiant Solar Power Station
