= Kinangop Wind Park =

Wind farm in Kenya

Kinangop Wind Park Project
- Location of Kinangop Wind Park in Kenya
- Country: Kenya
- Location: Nyandarua County, Kenya
- Coordinates: 0°49′41.22″S 36°33′19.27″E
- Status: In receivership

Power generation
- Units operational: 38
- Nameplate capacity: 60.8 MW

The 60.8 MW Kinangop Wind Park (KWP) project in Nyandarua County, Kenya. was the first fully licensed, independent large-scale wind farm to reach financial close in Kenya and on completion (scheduled for Q2 2015) was due to deliver electricity derived from renewable energy to circa 150,000 Kenyan households, via KPLC and the national grid.

== Project location ==
The project was to be located in the central Kenyan Highlands situated on the Kinangop Plateau, at an altitude of approximately 2,600 m above sea level, in Karati, Magumu and Heni Sub-locations of Nyandarua County.

== History ==
The Kinangop Wind Park project was launched in 2004 as a joint venture between EcoGen Wind Farms and Kengen. In January 2008, Aeolus Kenya acquired the rights to develop the project. The project consisted of setting up 38 GE Energy wind turbines that were designed to have a lifetime of 20 years. The operation and maintenance of the entire project was to be outsourced from General Electric (GE) of US under the Full Service Agreement.

In November 2013, The African Infrastructure Investment Fund 2 (“AIIF2”) and Norfund took over the ownership of the KWP project, leaving Aeolus Kenya as the project development company.

KWP Ltd and its shareholders announced in February 2016 that the project would not be completed due to civil disturbances in the local area of the project over a 21 month period resulting in delays which led to a depletion of funds, as well as court cases and hostilities from the community.

In April 2016 KWP was placed under receivership by Standard Bank of South Africa, which had lent the project debt finance. PwC as Receiver Managers of KWP subsequently advertised the sale of 38 wind turbines due to be used in the project, which were security for the loan that it now seeks to recover.

== Funding ==
The c. USD150 million KWP project was funded by way of equity from the African Infrastructure Investment Fund 2 (AIIF2) and Norfund, the Norwegian Investment Fund for Developing Countries, and debt supplied by Standard Bank South Africa.

As of December 2015, the shareholding in KWP was as follows:

Kinangop Wind Park Ownership
Rank	Name of Owner	Percentage Ownership
1	African Infrastructure Investment Fund II	81.00
2	Norfund	19.00
	Total	100.00

- AIIF2 is a USD547 million pan-African private equity infrastructure fund with Old Mutual as a major contributor.

== Project impact ==
The project was expected to be completed in mid - 2015 and would have had enough capacity to serve over 150,000 Kenyan households. In addition to power generation and local job creation, the project would have also reduced 847,252 tonnes of carbon dioxide in the environment during its first seven years.

Identified local landowners were to receive compensation for the use of their land, while additional Corporate Social Responsibility (CSR) funding was earmarked for the development and uplift of the local Kinangop community over the life of the project.

== Challenges ==
The project initially faced delays in June 2014 following demonstrations by local communities relating to land issues and local leaders who claimed they had not been adequately consulted. The demonstrations escalated culminating in a project wind mast being destroyed and the contractor withdrawing from the area for safety reasons.

On 21 May 2015 Kenya’s Business Daily newspaper reported: Local officials believed community fears about the project were fanned by opposition politicians looking for political gain before 2017 general elections in Kenya. "All the problems around this project are a result of incitement by (opposition) politicians taking advantage of people's ignorance about this project to excite emotions," Waithaka Mwangi, the governor of Nyandarua County, where the project is located, told a public rally in the area.

== See also ==
- Clean Development Mechanism
- Wind power in Kenya
- List of power stations in Kenya
- Energy in Kenya
- Lake Turkana Wind Power Station
- Ngong Hills Wind Farm
- UNFCCC
- Variability issues in wind power
