= Malindi Solar Power Station =

Solar farm in Kenya

- Country: Kenya
- Location: Malindi, Kilifi County
- Coordinates: 03°12′25″S 39°44′49″E
- Status: Operational
- Commission date: 2022
- Construction cost: US$66 Million
- Owner: Malindi Solar Group Limited

Solar farm
- Type: Flat-panel PV

Power generation
- Nameplate capacity: 52 MW (70,000 hp)

The Malindi Solar Power Station is a 52 MW (70,000 hp) solar power plant in Kenya.

== Location ==
The power station is located in Malindi, Kilifi County, at the Indian Ocean, approximately 116 kilometres (72 mi) by road north of Mombasa, the nearest large city. This is approximately 497 kilometres (309 mi), by road, south-east of Nairobi, the country's capital and largest city.

== Overview ==
The power station has a 52 megawatt capacity. Its output is planned to be sold directly to the Kenya Power and Lighting Company for integration into the national grid. It is expected most of the power generated will be consumed locally, in an area with increasing energy demand, limited energy supply and an expanding population. It is also anticipated that the power station will support the creation of jobs through direct employment and indirect job creation through more consistent supply of electricity. Up to 250 direct jobs are expected to be created, in addition to a further 5,600 jobs in the wider economy.

== Developers ==
The power station was developed by a consortium comprising the following corporations: (a) Commonwealth Development Corporation (b) Globeleq (c) Africa Energy Development Corporation (AEDC), the originator of the project and (d) IDEA Power.

== Ownership ==
When completed, the power station will be owned by Malindi Solar Group Limited, a special purpose vehicle company, which will operate the solar energy project. The ownership of Malindi Solar Group Limited is as illustrated in the table below:

Malindi Solar Group Limited Stock Ownership
Rank	Name of Owner	Domicile	Percentage	Notes
1	Globeleq	United Kingdom	60.0	
2	Norfund	Norway	30.0	
3	Africa Energy Development Corporation (AEDC)	Kenya	10.0	
	Total		100.00	

== Construction costs, funding, and commissioning ==
The construction of the solar power plant is budgeted at US$66 million, with US$50 million sourced from the CDC Group and US$16 million sourced from Globeleq. It was expected that the power station would come online in 2020. In January 2022, Afrik21.africa reported that the power station had started "commercial operations".

In February 2024, Kenyan media reported that Globeleq had received authorization from the Kenyan Energy and Petroleum Regulatory Authority (Epra) to invest KSh4.6 billion (US$29 million) in a battery storage system at this power station. The battery storage is expected to be in the 40 MWh range and is intended to respond to peak-hour demand between 7.30pm and 8.30pm Kenyan time.

== See also ==
- Alten Solar Power Station
- Eldosol Solar Power Station
- Radiant Solar Power Station
