= Amu Power Company =

Power generation company

Coordinates: 00°19′59″S 36°25′43″E

Amu Power Company Limited
- Type: Private
- Industry: Electric Power; Generation
- Founded: 2013
- Headquarters: Nairobi, Kenya
- Key people: Francis Njogu; Managing Director
- Products: Electricity
- Website: Homepage

Amu Power Company is a power generation company based in Nairobi, Kenya.

== Overview ==
Amu Power Company was formed as a consortium between Gulf Energy and Nairobi Securities Exchange-listed Centum Investment Company Limited.

The firm was awarded the tender by the Government of Kenya to develop a 981.5 Megawatt coal-fired power plant in the Manda area of Lamu County, dubbed the Lamu Coal Power Station. This would be the first coal power station in East Africa and the project is valued at KSh164 Billion.

The coal plant is being challenged in court and fought by local activists. Lamu is a UNESCO world heritage site that is threatened by the Plant. One could therefore argue the investment is in danger of failing to take off.

Hindpal Jabbal, the former chairman of Energy Regulation Commission of Kenya states that the coal plant is a massive waste of public funds as capacity charges alone will cost Kenyan Taxpayers KSh360 billion (US$360 million), annually, even if no electricity is consumed·

== Ownership ==
The company is owned by a consortium whose shareholding was as depicted in the table below, as of May 2018:

Amu Power Company Stock Ownership
Rank	Name of Owner	Percentage Ownership
1	Centum Investment Company Limited	
2	Gulf Energy	
3	China Huadian	
4	Sichuan Number 3 Power Construction Company	
5	Sichuan Electric Power Design and Consulting Company	
6	GE Power	20.00
	Total	100.00

== Lamu Coal Power Station ==
Lamu Coal Power Station is a proposed 981.5 megawatt coal-fired thermal power station in Kenya, the largest economy in the East African Community. The design of the coal plant, calls for the use of new and improved plant machinery, a boiler and steam turbine generator, as well as air quality control systems. The technology, built using General Electric's latest clean-coal technology, greatly reduces emission of sulfur dioxide, nitrogen oxide, and particulates (dusts) to levels comparable to gas-fired power plants.

== See also ==
- Kenya Electricity Generating Company
- Kenya Power and Lighting Company
- List of power stations in Kenya
