= KenGen Floating Solar Power Station =

Floating solar farm in Kenya

- Country: Kenya
- Location: Kamburu Dam, Machakos County
- Coordinates: 00°48′27″S 37°41′06″E
- Status: Proposed
- Construction began: H2 2024 Expected
- Owner: Kenya Electricity Generating Company (KenGen)
- Operator: KenGen

Solar farm
- Type: Flat-panel PV

Power generation
- Nameplate capacity: 42.5 MW (57,000 hp)

The KenGen Floating Solar Power Station (KFSPS), is a planned 42.5 MW (57,000 hp) solar power plant in Kenya.

== Location ==
The power station is planned on the Tana River, adjacent to the Kamburu Dam, in Machakos County. Kamburu Dam is located approximately 140 kilometres (87 mi) by road north-east of Nairobi, the country's capital and largest city.

== Overview ==
In 2020, KenGen the national parastatal electricity utility company of Kenya carried out a pre-feasibility study for a floating solar farm adjacent to two dams in the Seven Forks group; namely Kamburu and Kiambere as well as Turkwel in Turkana County. That study selected Kamburu due to multiple factors including cost, steady water levels, road accessibility and proximity to transmission infrastructure.

The pre-feasibility study was funded by the Kreditanstalt für Wiederaufbau (KfW), the German state-owned investment and development bank, based in Frankfurt. The study was executed by Multiconsult, the Norwegian consulting engineering firm. The solar farm will be deployed during the day, especially in the dry season. This will preserve the water to generate hydropower during the night.

== Developers ==
The power station is under development by Kenya Electricity Generation Company, who own it, in collaboration with the French Development Agency.

== Timetable ==
It is anticipated that construction will commence in H2 2024, last 28 months and conclude in H2 2026. In January 2024, KenGen solicited bids from qualified companies and consortia to provide consulting services for the "supervision and management of the 42.5MW" solar power plant.

== See also ==
- List of power stations in Kenya
