= Bubisa Wind Power Station =

Wind farm in Kenya

- Country: Kenya
- Location: Bubisa, Marsabit County, Kenya
- Coordinates: 02°42′49″N 38°04′59″E
- Status: Proposed
- Commission date: 2026 Expected
- Owner: Gitson Energy

Power generation
- Nameplate capacity: 300MW

The Bubisa Wind Power Station is a planned 300 megawatts wind power energy project, in Kenya. The power station is owned and under development by Gitson Energy, an independent power producer (IPP), owned by Kenyans in the diaspora. The project received initial regulatory approval in 2010. However, land acquisition delays, followed by backtracking by the Kenyan government, forced the owner/investor to go to court for redress. In the fourth quarter of calendar year 2021, the Kenya High Court, sitting in the city of Mombasa, restored the rights of the owner/investor to proceed with development of the power station.

== Location ==
The wind farm would be located near the settlement of Bubisa, in Marsabit County, in Kenya's arid northwest. Bubisa is located approximately 47 kilometres (29 mi) northeast of the town of Marsabit, where the county headquarters are located. Bubisa is located approximately 198 kilometres (123 mi), southwest of Moyale, Kenya, at the international border with Ethiopia. Bubisa is approximately 576 kilometres (358 mi) north of Nairobi, Kenya's capital city.

== Overview ==
The planned generation capacity of this wind farm is 300 megawatts. Delays in the land acquisition process and then withdrawal of licensing, after it was granted, delayed commencement of construction since 2010.

A court ruling in November 2021, directed regulatory agencies within the Government of Kenya, to issue unencumbered licenses to Gitson Energy, the owner/developer of this wind farm.

Back in 2010, the plan was to build a new 200 kilometres (124 mi) high voltage power line from Bubisa to join the Loiyangalani–Suswa High Voltage Power Line and evacuate the energy generated at this power station. The power would be sold to Kenya Power and Lighting.

== Funding ==
Initially, the World Bank had agreed to provide funding for this renewable energy project. In 2012, the World Bank pulled out of this deal.

Gitson Energy has been promised funding from various sources, including (a) the Export–Import Bank of the United States (b) the Overseas Private Investment Corporation, which today is the U.S. International Development Finance Corporation.

== See also ==
- List of power stations in Kenya
- Lake Turkana Wind Power Station
