= Tsavo Thermal Power Station =

Power station in Kenya

- Location of Tsavo Thermal Power Station
- Country: Kenya
- Location: Mombasa
- Coordinates: 04°01′53″S 39°38′02″E
- Status: Operational
- Commission date: 2001; 25 years ago
- Decommission date: September 2021
- Owner: Tsavo Power Company Limited

Thermal power station
- Primary fuel: Heavy fuel oil

Power generation
- Nameplate capacity: 75 MW (101,000 hp)

Tsavo Thermal Power Station, also Kipevu II Thermal Power Station is a 75 MW (101,000 hp), heavy fuel oil-fired thermal power station in Kenya.

== Location ==
The power station is located in the port city of Mombasa, adjacent to a similar state-owned project known as Kipevu I Thermal Power Station. The coordinates of the power station are: 4°01'53.0"S, 39°38'02.0"E (Latitude:4°01'53.0"S; Longitude:39°38'02.0"E).

== Overview ==
The power station is owned and operated by Tsavo Power Company Limited (TPCL). TPCL is in turn owned by a consortium of international power developers and financiers including the International Finance Corporation, the UK-based Actis Capital, the Finnish company Wärtsilä, US-based Cinergy Global Power and the Aga Khan Fund for Economic Development. The power company came online in 2001. The electricity generated is sold to Kenya Power and Lighting Company, under a 20-year power purchase agreement. The raw material for the power plant is Heavy Fuel Oil. In 2015, Actis Capital sold their shareholding to the CDC Group and Norfund for US$227 million.

== Developers and financing ==
The table below summarizes the shareholding in Tsavo Power Company Limited (TPCL), the owner-operator of Tsavo Thermal Power Station, as at 1 April 2016:

Tsavo Power Company Limited Stock Ownership
Rank	Name of Owner	Percentage Ownership
1	AKFED & Cinergy Global Power Inc.	47.0
2	CDC Group	15.0
3	Norfund	15.0
4	Wärtsilä	13.0
5	International Finance Corporation	10.0
	Total	100.00

== See also ==
- Kenya Power Stations
- Africa Power Stations
- World Power Stations
