= Impact Fund Denmark =

Danish government-owned development finance institution

- Type: Parastatal
- Industry: Development Finance
- Founded: 1967; 59 years ago
- Headquarters: Copenhagen, Denmark
- Key people: Michael Rasmussen; Chairman; Torben Huss; Chief Executive Officer
- Products: Equity Financing, Advisory Services, Loans, Consulting
- Website: impactfund.dk

Impact Fund Denmark (IFDK), formerly known as the Investment Fund for Developing Countries (Investeringsfonden for Udviklingslande) (IFU), is a Development Financial Institution owned by the Government of Denmark. IFDK is a self-governing, state-owned fund, whose objective is to promote economic and social development in developing countries. The Fund provides risk capital and advice to companies wanting to do business in parts of Europe, Asia, Latin America and Africa.

Investments are made on commercial terms in the form of loans and equity, with the purpose of contribution to economic and social development in the investment countries and support the attainment of the United Nations Sustainable Development Goals.

== Location ==
The headquarters and main offices of IFDK are located at Fredericiagade 27, 1310 Copenhagen K, Denmark. The geographical coordinates of the company headquarters are:55°41'08.9"N, 12°35'24.5"E (Latitude:55.685806; Longitude:12.590139). IFDK also maintains regional offices in Africa, Asia, Latin America, Central and Eastern Europe.

As of August 2020, IFDK maintained regional offices in these cities: 1. Copenhagen 2. Accra 3. Ho Chi Minh City 4. Kyiv 5. Lima 6. Nairobi 7. New Delhi 8. São Paulo 9. Shanghai 10. Singapore. (Near bottom of reference page).

== Overview ==
IFDK was founded in 1967, as an independent government-owned fund offering advisory services and risk capital to companies wishing to do business in developing countries and emerging markets. In addition to investing its own money, IFDK acts as a fund manager. As of August 2020, IFDK had co-invested in over 1,300 companies in more than 100 countries. The investment portfolio totals DKK:209 billion (€29.07 billion), to which IFDK as contributed DKK:23 billion (€3.09 billion).

Before 31 December 2016, IFDK’s involvement was tied to the participation of a Danish company or the existence of a Danish interest. That requirement was dropped in December 2016. IFDK does not provide business grants or development aid. Over time the investments have returned good results to the countries hosting the investments, the Danish companies and to IFDK. In the 2014 to 2019 time period, gross yields on invested share capital averaged in excess of 12 percent annually.

IFDK rebranded from Investment Fund for Developing Countries (IFU) in June 2026, reflecting its global outlook and its desire to grow engagement and invest in lasting change.

== Ownership ==
Impact Fund Denmark is 100 percent owned by the government of Denmark.

== Governance ==
Michael Rasmussen serves as the chairman of the company. Effective 1 January 2019, Torben Huss is the chief executive officer of Investment Fund for Developing Countries.

== Recent investments ==
IFDK is an equity investor in Lake Turkana Wind Power Station, a 310 megawatts power plant, that is Africa’s largest wind farm. It supplies approximately 15 percent of Kenya's electricity needs.

IFDK owns 9.97 percent of DFCU Bank, the fifth-largest commercial bank in Uganda. The shareholding was acquired in December 2019 from the CDC Group of the United Kingdom.

In March 2019, IDFK lent KSh:1.2 billion (approx. US$11.2 million) to Sidian Bank, a Kenyan commercial bank. During the next 36 months, IFDK has the option to convert a portion or all of the principal into share capital in the bank. If all the principal is converted into capital, the Fund will acquire 20 percent shareholding in the bank and gain two seats on the expanded seven-person bank board. Each of the other shareholders will be diluted proportionately.

== See also ==
- German Investment Corporation
- Danish International Development Agency
- French Development Agency
- Netherlands Development Finance Company
