= Kipeto Wind Power Station =

Wind farm in Kenya

- Location of Kipeto Wind Power Station in Kenya
- Country: Kenya
- Location: Kiserian, Kajiado County
- Coordinates: 01°43′09″S 36°41′40″E
- Status: Operational
- Commission date: 25 January 2021
- Owner: Kipeto Energy Limited

Thermal power station
- Primary fuel: Wind power

Wind farm
- Type: Onshore

Power generation
- Nameplate capacity: 100 megawatts (130,000 hp)

External links
- Website: kipetoenergy.co.ke

The Kipeto Wind Power Station, also Kajiado Wind Power Project, is a 100 megawatts (130,000 hp) wind-powered electricity power station in Kenya. It is the second-largest wind farm in the country, behind the 310 megawatts Lake Turkana Wind Power Station.

== Location ==
The Kipeto Power Station is located in the foothills of Ngong Hills, in Kajiado County, approximately 80 kilometres (50 mi), by road, south of Nairobi, the capital and largest city in the country. The geographical coordinates of Kipeto Wind Farm are 01°43'09.0"S, 36°41'40.0"E (Latitude:-1.719167; Longitude:36.694444).

== Overview ==
The power station was originally owned by a consortium of investors, financiers and interest groups, including the International Finance Corporation. In July 2015, Kipeto Energy Limited, the owner/operator of the power station, signed a renewable 20 year power purchase agreement with Kenya Power, the national electricity distributor and retailer. In December 2018, Actis Capital of the United Kingdom, acquired majority shareholding in the special purpose vehicle company, for an undisclosed sum.

The power station comprises 60 General Electric turbines, each rated at 1.7 megawatts. The wind farm, which sits on 70 square kilometres (27 mi^{2}) received insurance coverage from the African Trade and Investment Development Insurance (ATIDI), covering the owner against late payments or no payments for energy supplied.

== Ownership ==
Kipeto Energy Limited (KEL) is the special purpose vehicle created by the consortium of shareholders, to construct, operate and manage the power station. The shareholding in KEL, before December 2018, was as depicted in this reference. As of December 2018, 88 percent shareholding in Kipeto Energy Limited was owned by BTE Renewables of South Africa. In July 2023 Meridiam of France acquired that shareholding, to become the majority shareholder.

Kipeto Energy Limited Stock Ownership After 3 July 2023
| Rank | Shareholder | Domicile | Percentage Ownership |
|---|---|---|---|
| 1 | Meridiam | France | 88.00 |
| 2 | Craftskills Wind Energy International | Kenya | 12.00 |
| | Total | | 100.00 |

== Construction and financing ==
In January 2016, KEL contracted the Chinese company "China Machinery Engineering Corporation" to perform engineering design, procurement and construction (EPC) of the wind farm. The Overseas Private Investment Corporation (OPIC) has committed to lend $233 million (Sh24 billion) towards this project. The American conglomerate General Electric Wind Energy, was contracted in December 2018 to supply 60 GE 1.7-103 wind turbines for the power station. In August 2018, the Kipeto Wind Energy Company, represented by Kenneth Namunje and Overseas Private Investment Corporation, represented by Ray Washburne, signed a definitive loan agreement for US$237, from OPIC to Kipeto Energy for the construction of this power station. The ceremony, that took place in Washington DC on 27 August 2017, was witnessed by Uhuru Kenyatta, the president of Kenya and Wilbur Ross, the United States secretary of commerce.

== Commercial operations ==
The power station began commercial operations in July 2021. The energy generated is purchased by Kenya Power and Lighting Company, under a 20-year power purchase agreement. The power is evacuated from the wind farm via a 220kV transmission line to a substation at Isinya, where it enters the national electricity grid. The total cost of this development is reported to be US$344 million. OPIC lent US$233 million and BTE Renewables, raised the remaining US$111 million.

== See also ==
- List of power stations in Kenya
- List of power stations in Africa
- List of power stations
- Energy in Kenya
