= Baringo Thermal Power Station =

Power station in Kenya

- Country: Kenya
- Location: Baringo County
- Coordinates: 00°30′28″N 35°45′02″E
- Status: In development
- Commission date: October 2016 (Expected)
- Owner: Cummins Power Generation Limited

Thermal power station
- Primary fuel: Biogas

Power generation
- Nameplate capacity: 12 MW (16,092 hp)

Baringo Thermal Power Station, also Cummins Thermal Power Station, is a 12 MW (16,092 hp) biogas-fired thermal power station in Kenya, the largest economy in East African Community.

== Location ==
The power station is located in Baringo County, in what was formerly known as Rift Valley Province, approximately 300 kilometres (190 mi), by road, north- west of Nairobi, the capital and largest city of Kenya. The approximate coordinates of Baringo Thermal Power Station are:00°30'28.0"N, 35°45'02.0"E (Latitude:0.507777; Longitude:35.750557).

== Overview ==
The power station, which was expected to come online in March 2015, has a maximum generating capacity of 12 Megawatts. Construction was completed in February 2015. The initial phase of the power station will produce 2.4 MW. Cummins Power Generation Limited, the company that owns the power station, has signed a power purchasing agreement with Kenya Power and Lighting Company, to supply 2MW to the national electricity grid during the first phase. The power supplied will increase with each subsequent phase.

Power is generated using plant material from the Mathenge tree (Prosopis juliflora), which grows abundantly in the arid environment of Baringo County. About 2,000 households from the county have been contracted to supply tree stems of the plant as raw materials for power generation. The plant material is allowed to decompose anaerobically, generating gases, including methane. The gases are burnt, generating heat, which is used to heat water, generating steam. The steam is then used to run electricity generators.

== Developers and financing ==
The Baringo Power Station has a construction budget of KSh2.7 billion (US$30 million). The power station is jointly owned by Cummins Inc. of the United States and Gentec Energy Plc. of the United Kingdom. Equity Bank Kenya Limited provided 70% (approximately US$21 million) in loan financing and the 30% (US$9 million) was provided by the shareholders. The first phase will provide 2.4 Megawatts, of which 2 Megawatts will be sold to the national grid. The second phase will increase production to 7 Megawatts. The Third and final phase will ramp up production to 10.8 MW. The excess power not sold to Kenya Power will be used internally by the power plant.

== See also ==
- List of power stations in Kenya
