= Dongo Kundu Thermal Power Station =

Thermal power station in Kenya

- Country: Kenya
- Location: Dongo Kundu
- Coordinates: 04°03′53″S 39°36′33″E
- Status: Cancelled
- Commission date: N/A
- Owner: TBD

Thermal power station
- Primary fuel: Liquefied natural gas

Power generation
- Nameplate capacity: 700 MW

The proposed Dongo Kundu Thermal Power Station is a potential 700 megawatt natural gas-fired thermal power station in Kenya.

== Location ==
The power station would be located in the Dongo Kundu neighborhood in Mombasa County at the country's Indian Ocean coast.

== Overview ==
The Kenyan government originally planned to import 1 million metric tonnes of liquefied natural gas from Qatar to fire the power plant. However, following natural gas discoveries in the northeastern parts of Kenya, the government announced that the importation contract was being put on hold.

== History ==
In January 2014, the government of Kenya, shortlisted international power companies to design, build and own a 700 MW thermal power station using liquefied natural gas. Twelve companies were shortlisted including the following: China Petroleum, Tata Power in consortium with Gulf Energy, Globlec, Mitsui and Company, Toyota Tutshu, Marubeni Corporation, Sumsang C and T, GMR Energy, Quantum power and GDF Suez.

In June 2014 Kenyan print media reported that construction would begin in August 2014. In September 2014, the government announced plans to re-tender the selection of the investor/developer following an unsatisfactory response to the initial bidding process.

== Cancellation ==
In April 2016, the government of Kenya announced that it was abandoning plans to develop the power station, out of fear of generating overcapacity.

== See also ==
- List of power stations in Kenya
- List of power stations in Africa
- List of power stations
