= Lamu Coal Power Station =

Proposed coal-fired power station in Kenya

Lamu Coal Power Station (proposed)
- Proposed location of Lamu Coal Power Station in Kenya
- Country: Kenya
- Location: Lamu
- Coordinates: 02°09′13″S 40°54′12″E
- Status: Planned and halted
- Owner: Amu Power Company

Thermal power station
- Primary fuel: Coal

Power generation
- Nameplate capacity: 1,050 MW (1,410,000 hp)

The proposed Lamu Coal Power Station is a potential 1,050 MW (1,410,000 hp) coal-fired thermal power station in Kenya. The proposed plant would be developed on 865 acres of land and feature a 210-meter-tall (690 ft) smokestack, which would become East Africa's tallest structure. It would have been the first ever coal power plant in Kenya.

Kenya national government and media have been largely positive about the economic benefits from the coal plant activity. However, community advocates and some local government officials expressed concern over whether the benefits would be well distributed, whether the jobs would really materialise, and the lack of discussion over possible negative effects from the project.

As of June 2017, recent coverage has centred on the lack of economic viability and need for the proposed Lamu coal plant, citing a range of experts in news and analysis pieces. International accountability organisations also raised concerns in a series of global blog posts.

The project was halted on 26 June 2019.

== Location ==
The power station would be located on 975.4 acres (395 ha) in the Kwasasi area, about 21 kilometres (13 mi) north of the town of Lamu in Lamu County, along Kenya's Indian Ocean coast. This is approximately 250 kilometres (160 mi), by air, north-east of Mombasa. The driving distance is approximately 300 kilometres (190 mi).

== Overview ==
Construction was expected to begin in September 2015 and last approximately 21 months. Once constructed, it would have been the largest single power station in Kenya. The power generated would be transmitted to Nairobi, the country's capital, via a new 520 kilometres (320 mi), 400 kiloVolt electricity transmission line. In the initial years, the station would have utilize imported coal, mainly from South Africa, and later convert to locally sourced coal from the Mui Basin in Kitui County. In September 2016, Kenyan print media indicated that construction was expected to begin in the fourth quarter of 2016 and last 42 months. In June 218, the Energy Regulatory Commission instructed the developers of this power station to reduce its capacity from the original 1,050 megawatts to something smaller, in the 450 to 600 megawatts range.

== Controversy ==
Community activists and some local officials have also raised the need for revenue sharing for the community, and what conditions would be set for the project to ensure it would benefit the host community, citing the fact that community members affected by the earlier oil infrastructure project known as Lamu Port and Lamu-Southern Sudan-Ethiopia Transport Corridor have not been compensated. Community, Kenyan and international activists and one of the world's leading economists Joseph Stiglitz have raised serious concerns about the environmental and human health implications of the fossil fuel plant. The population wants cleaner, more progressive renewable energy.

The plant will cause massive pollution according to various reports including John Musingi PhD, a senior lecturer and Programme Coordinator of Environment Planning and Management, in the Department of Geography and Environmental Studies, at Nairobi University. There is no demand for the proposed 1,050 Mw of power in Kenya to date or for the foreseeable future as Kenya is sufficient in energy generation at this time. Aside from this Turkana wind Power's 310 MW was still not connected to the national grid as of June 2018; and will supply additional power to an already over-supplied Kenya.

China is seen to be exporting second hand coal plants to Africa and the expense of the African Nations that take them on. Ernest Niemi, an economist and president of Natural Resource Economics, who has done studies on coal plants across the world for over 40 years, said that operating the AMU Power coal plant to produce electricity will be cheap for the developers but expensive as an energy source to consumers and detrimental to the society in general.

Testifying before the National Environmental Tribunal in Nairobi in June 2017, the US-based consultant said Kenya will incur a massive health burden coupled with deaths with the operation of the plant. Studies across the world, he said, show that the social cost of running coal-fired power plants exceeds the economic benefits.

Save Lamu has tabled numerous malpractices by Kenya National Environmental Management Authority (Nema), in approving the license to Amu Power. The right to comment to the public hearing was for every Kenyan, and the ERC failure to identify an accessible and safe venue for all was a clear plan to keep opposition away from the hearing.

The Secretary-General of Save Lamu, Walid Ahmed, said that, on several occasions, ERC had tried to lock out Lamu residents and activists from attending their meetings and airing their views concerning the coal plant project.

Walid Ahmed also said that residents have not been provided with enough time to go through the environmental and social impact assessment report that was released by Amu Power Company in order for the residents to give their opinion. "Even before they approved the project, they had already shown signs of locking us out including changing planned venues for public hearing on the coal project. We will not relent. We will fight till the end. Our fishermen, mangrove harvesters and the population at large have a stake in sustainable environment that is free from pollution. The coal plant is harmful and is likely to affect the marine ecosystem and the livelihoods of our people. We won't accept it," said Mr Walid.

Save Lamu Coordinator Khadija Shekue Famau said that despite the concerns raised, there are no proper mitigation measures that the investor has put in place or even explained to the communities and stakeholders how emissions from the plant will be handled.

A former chairman of the Energy Regulatory Commission estimates that capacity charges would be Sh36 billion per year.

The Lamu coal plant created more national controversy after the resignation of a senior government officer in the County Government of Lamu, Samia Omar Bwana, in protest against the project. Following her resignation, Ms. Bwana went on to partner with organizations and individuals to form the national movement, deCOALonize, to initiate a national and international awareness campaign on the cause.

The national interest of the campaign increased since, starting from 2017 as part of the national movement consisting of Save Lamu and other local and international organizations and individuals. The aim of the movement is to provide information to local communities, policy makers, academics, and civil society, on alternatives to coal and embracing clean energy in Kenya. Before then, Save Lamu was the sole voice protesting against the Lamu coal plant on behalf of the Lamu community and other local politicians.

The joint effort with the grassroots organization and the national partners and volunteers led to the successful win by Save Lamu in Kenya's National Environmental Tribunal which on June 26, 2019 ruled in favor of the community to cancel the license for the construction of the Lamu coal-fired power station. The project proponents Amu power have is since appealed the decision which is under determination. According to the United Nations Environment Programme, this victory shows lessons for other community-led environmental campaigns.

== History ==
In January 2014, the Government of Kenya sourced for bids from private developers to build, own, and operate the power station. In September 2014, the development rights were awarded to a consortium of the following entities:

- Gulf Energy - An independent Kenyan energy generating company
- Centum Investments - A private equity firm, headquartered in Nairobi, with investments in Kenya and Uganda.
- Sichuan Electric Power Design and Consulting Company Limited (SEDC) - A subsidiary of Power Construction Corporation of China (PowerChina)

Two of the losing bidders challenged the award in court. An arbitration tribunal, however, upheld the award in January 2015.

== Developers and financing ==
The power station will be built using private funds on a build-own-operate model. The developers will own and operate the plant for 25 years from commissioning. The expected construction costs for the coal plant will be about US$2 billion (KES:180 billion). Of this, approximately US$500 million will be generated internally while the balance will be borrowed.

Amu Power Company, a special purpose vehicle formed by the developers, will develop, own and operate the station as part of the "Lamu Port and Lamu-Southern Sudan-Ethiopia Transport Corridor".

In July 2016, Standard Bank of South Africa and ICBC agreed to jointly fund the $300 million that was needed to close the deal. In October 2017, Standard Bank retracted the support.

Fund Sources for Lamu Coal Power Station
No.	Name of Lender	Loan Amount (US$)	Percentage of Total
1	Amu Power Company	0.5 billion	25.0
2	Industrial and Commercial Bank of China	1.2 billion	60.0
3	Standard Bank of South Africa	0.3 billion	15.0
	Total	2.0 billion	100.00

== See also ==
- List of power stations in Kenya
