= Ndula Hydroelectric Power Station =

Hydroelectric power station in Kenya

- Location within Kenya
- Country: Kenya
- Coordinates: 01°01′35″S 37°14′36″E
- Purpose: Power
- Status: Operational
- Owner: Kenya Electricity Generating Company

Dam and spillways
- Impounds: Thika River

Ndula Hydroelectric Power Station
- Coordinates: 01°01′35″S 37°14′36″E
- Operator: Kenya Electricity Generating Company
- Commission date: 1924
- Type: Run-of-the-river
- Turbines: 2 X 1.0MW
- Installed capacity: 2.0 MW (2,700 hp)

The Ndula Hydroelectric Power Station is a 2.0 MW (2,700 hp) hydroelectric power station on the Thika River in Kenya.

== Location ==
The power station is located approximately 25 kilometres (16 mi), by road, east of the town of Thika, Kiambu County. This is approximately 65 kilometres (40 mi), by road, northeast of Nairobi, the capital and largest city in the country. The coordinates of the power station are: 1°01'35.0"S, 37°14'36.0"E (Latitude:-1.026384; Longitude:37.243335).

== Overview ==
Ndula Power Station was commissioned in 1924 and was decommisoned in December 2010 due to operational challenges. It has two horizontal Francis turbines, driving two generators. It is owned and operated by Kenya Electricity Generating Company.

Ndula Power Station is set to become the first electric power museum in East Africa following the signing of a Memorandum of Understanding between KenGen Foundation and National Museums of Kenya.

== Ownership ==
Ndula Hydroelectric Power Station is 100 percent owned by Kenya Electricity Generating Company, a parastatal company of the government of Kenya.

== See also ==
- List of power stations in Kenya
