= Biojoule Thermal Power Station =

Biogas power station in Kenya

- Country: Kenya
- Location: Naivasha
- Coordinates: 00°41′37″S 36°25′55″E
- Status: Operational
- Commission date: 2015
- Owner: Biojoule Kenya Limited

Thermal power station
- Primary fuel: Biogas

Power generation
- Nameplate capacity: 2.4 MW (3,218 hp)

Biojoule Thermal Power Station is a 2.4 MW (3,218 hp) biogas-fired thermal power station in Kenya, the largest economy in East African Community.

== Location ==
The power station is located in Naivasha, Nakuru County, approximately 93 kilometres (58 mi), by road, northwest of Nairobi, the capital of Kenya, and the largest city in that country. The approximate coordinates of the power plant are:0°41'37.0"S, 36°25'55.0"E (Latitude:-0.693611; Longitude:36.431944).

== Overview ==
The power station, which is came online in September 2015, has a generating capacity of 2.4 Megawatts. Construction was completed in January 2015. Biojoule Kenya Limited, the company that owns the power station, signed a 20-year power purchasing agreement with Kenya Power and Lighting Company, to supply 2MW to the national electricity grid. The power station us the first biogas-fired power plant to sell power to the national grid. Power is generated using plant waste generated on the 800 hectares (2,000 acres) Gorge Farm, near Lake Naivasha, owned by VP Group, an investor in the power project. The plant material is allowed to decompose anaerobically, generating gases, including methane. The gases are burnt, generating heat, which is used to heat water, generating steam. The steam is then used to run electricity generators. Some of the heat is used to warm greenhouses on the arm. The power generated will be evacuated via a substation within nearby Naivasha Town.

== Developers and financing ==
Biojoule Power plant was constructed at a cost of KSh591 million (US$6.5 million). The project was developed by Tropical Power Limited, which acted as the investor, engineering, procurement and construction (EPC) contractor, and plant operator.The power station is 50% owned by the family that owns VP Group. The remaining 50% is owned by Tropical Power. CfC Stanbic Bank provided a loan of US$3.25 million, while the owners raised the remaining US$3.25. The power remaining over after sale to Kenya Power will be sold to the VP Group and some will be used internally by the power station.

== Other considerations ==
In addition to producing electricity and heat, the plant will produce an estimated 35,000 tonnes of fertilizer annually, from the remnants of anaerobic digestion. In addition to the plant material generated at Gorge Farm Energy Park, more raw material will be sourced from the neighboring Van den Berg Roses Farm.

== See also ==
- Kenya Power Stations
- Africa Power Stations
- World Power Stations
