= Rabai Thermal Power Station =

- Location of Rabai Thermal Power Station in Kenya
- Country: Kenya
- Location: Rabai
- Coordinates: 03°56′02″S 39°33′39″E
- Status: Operational
- Commission date: 2009
- Owner: Rabai Power Company

Thermal power station
- Primary fuel: Heavy fuel oil

Power generation
- Nameplate capacity: 90 MW

External links
- Website: rabaipower.com

Rabai Thermal Power Station is a 90 megawatt heavy fuel oil-fired thermal power station in Kilifi County, Kenya.

== Location ==
The power station is located just outside of the town of Rabai, in Kilifi County, approximately 24 kilometres (15 mi), by road, northwest of the port city of Mombasa. This location lies approximately 462 kilometres (287 mi), by road, southeast of Kenya's capital city, Nairobi. The coordinates of the power station are:3°56'02.0"S, 39°33'39.0"E (Latitude:-3.933886; Longitude:39.560825).

== Developers and financing ==
The power station was built using private funds on a build-own-operate model. The developers will own and operate the plant for 25 years from commissioning. The construction costs for the plant were KSh12 billion (approx. US$120 million). The two leading owner-developers are Burmeister & Wain Scandinavian Contractor A/S (BWSC) of Demnmark, and Aldwych International Ltd (Aldwych) of the United Kingdom.

== See also ==
- List of power stations in Kenya
- List of power stations in Africa
- List of power stations
