= Kopere Solar Power Station =

Solar power stations in Kenya

- Country: Kenya
- Location: Kopere, Nandi County
- Coordinates: 00°00′02″S 35°11′50″E
- Status: Proposed
- Construction began: 2019 Expected
- Commission date: 2021 Expected
- Owner: Voltalia Portugal SA

Solar farm
- Type: Flat-panel PV

Power generation
- Nameplate capacity: 50 megawatts (67,000 hp)

Kopere Solar Power Station, is a planned 50 megawatts (67,000 hp) solar power plant in Kenya, the largest economy in the East African Community.

== Location ==
The power station would be located in the neighborhood known as Kopere, in Nandi County, close to the border with Kisumu County, approximately 310 kilometres (193 mi), by road, north-west of Nairobi, Kenya's capital and largest city. The solar farm would sit on approximately 250 acres (101 ha) of land.

== Overview ==
Kenya has ambitions to electrify 100 percent of the country's population, up from 70 percent in 2017. This development and the 55 megawatts Garissa Solar Power Station, owned by Kenya Rural Electrification Authority, are aimed to diversify Kenya's electricity sources, given the unpredictability of hydro-power in this East African country. The project was initiated by Portuguese energy firm Martifer Solar and was later acquired by the French firm in 2016.

This power station is expected to supply at least 600,000 on-grid customers. In addition to the power station, the developers will construct a 33/132kV sub-station and a 1.8 kilometres (1 mi), transmission line to integrate the estimated 106GWh generated annually into the national grid.

== Developers ==
The power station is being developed by Voltalia Portugal SA, the Portuguese subsidiary of the French company Voltalia. The developers have signed a 20-year power purchase agreement with electricity distributor Kenya Power and Lighting Company. Voltalia is expected to own and operate the solar farm and power station, after commissioning.

== Construction timeline, costs and funding ==
Construction is expected to start in 2019. In December 2018, the African Development Bank (AfDB) committed to lend US$18.17 million towards the construction of this power station. At that time, AfDB was also in the process of securing another US$11.6 million concessional loan from the Climate Investment Fund’s Scaling-up Renewable Energy Program (SREP), to lend towards this development as well.

== See also ==
- List of power stations in Kenya
- Garissa Solar Power Station
