= River Sondu Miriu =

River in Kenya

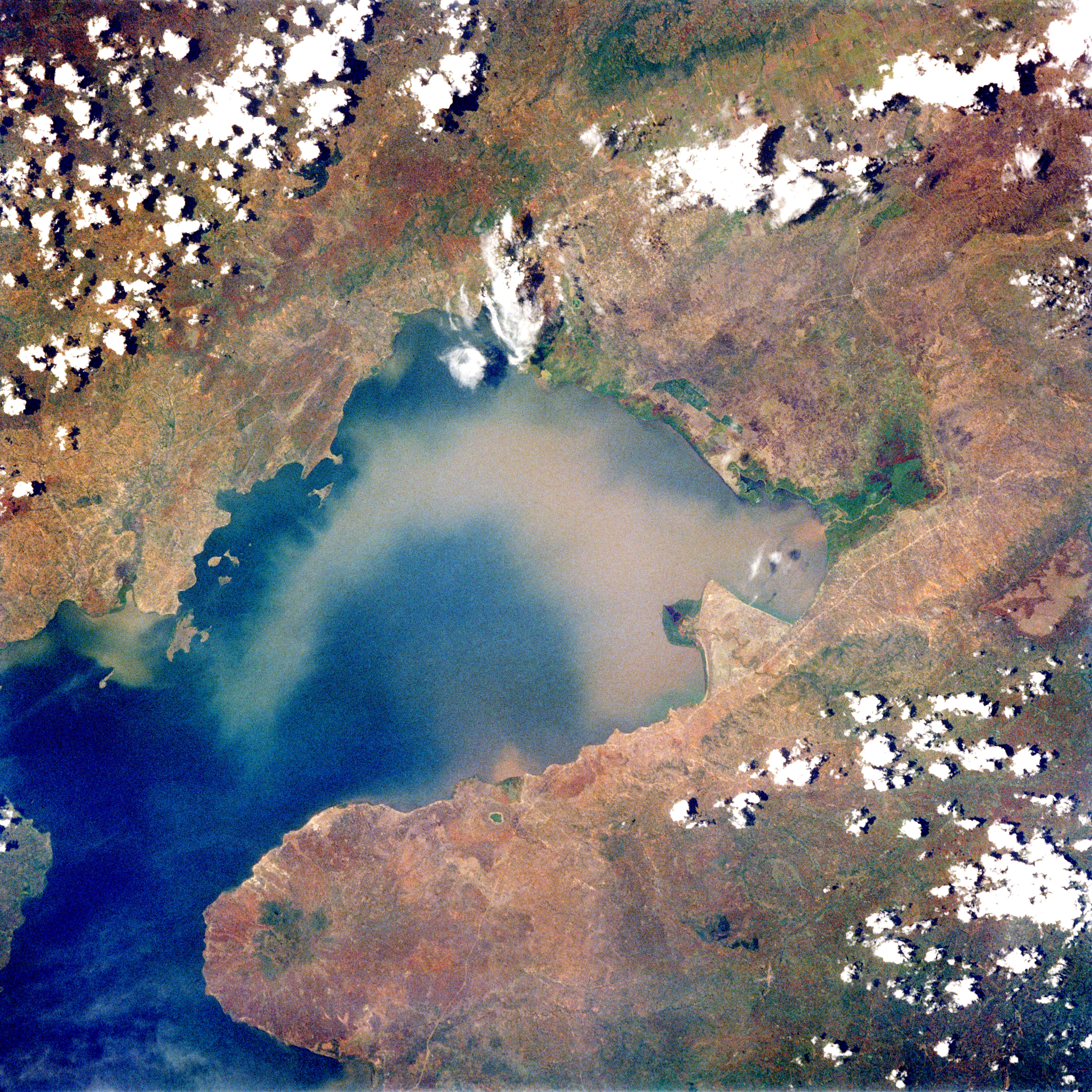

Physical characteristics
- Mouth: Lake Victoria

River Sondu Miriu is an expansive river in western Kenya that flows into Lake Victoria. It contributes significantly to the region's hydrology, energy generation, biodiversity, and cultural heritage. The river's catchment basin encompasses sections of Kericho, Kisumu, Nyando, and Homa Bay counties, making it an important resource for communities, agriculture, and national development.

== Geography and course ==
The Sondu Miriu River originates on the Mau Escarpment in the Rift Valley region and flows through Bomet, Kericho and Kisumu counties before draining into Lake Victoria.The basin comprises around 3,470 km² and includes marshes, forested uplands, and agricultural plains.

== Hydroelectric power ==
The river is host to the Sondu Miriu Hydroelectric Power Station, a 60 MW run-of-river project managed by the Kenya Electricity Generating Company (KenGen). The project began in 1999, with final commissioning in 2008, and it provides a considerable contribution to Kenya's national grid. In addition, the Sang'oro Hydroelectric Power Station was later constructed to utilize discharged water from Sondu Miriu, adding 20 MW of renewable energy.

== Cultural importance ==
The river is culturally significant to communities in western Kenya, particularly the Luo people. It promotes traditional fishing activities and is recognized in local history as a sacred and symbolic water source.

== See also ==
- Geography of Kenya
- List of rivers of Kenya
