= Sang'oro Hydroelectric Power Station =

Power plant in Kenya

- Location within Kenya
- Country: Kenya
- Coordinates: 0°21′13″S 34°48′48″E
- Purpose: Power
- Status: Operational
- Construction began: 2008
- Owner: Kenya Electricity Generating Company

Dam and spillways
- Impounds: Sondu River

Sang'oro Hydroelectric Power Station
- Operator: Kenya Electricity Generating Company
- Commission date: 2013
- Type: Run-of-the-river
- Turbines: 2 X 10.1MW
- Installed capacity: 20.2 MW (27,100 hp)

The Sang'oro Hydroelectric Power Station is a 20.2 MW (27,100 hp) hydroelectric power station on the Sondu River in Kenya.

== Location ==
The power station is located approximately 5 kilometres (3 mi), by road, west of the power house of Sondu Miriu Hydroelectric Power Station, at the point where the discharge channel of Sondu Miriu enters the Sondu River. This lies near Kusa Village, approximately 55 kilometres (34 mi), by road, southeast of Kisumu, the location of the county headquarters. The coordinates of Sang'oro Hydroelectric Power Station are:0°21'13.0"S, 34°48'48.0"E (Latitude:-0.353623; Longitude:34.813341).

== Overview ==
After Sondu Miriu Hydroelectric Power Station was built, in order to minimize water wastage, a decision was made to use Sondu Miriu's effluent water to power another power station. The new station, Sang'oro Hydroelectric Power Station, was built between 2008 and 2013, at the confluence of the discharge channel from Sondu Miriu and the Sondu River. Japan International Cooperation Agency loaned funds and Kenya Electricity Generating Company contributed equity to the construction bill of US$78 million (Sh6.5 billion).

== Ownership ==
Sang'oro Hydroelectric Power Station is 100 percent owned by Kenya Electricity Generating Company, a parastatal company of the government of Kenya.

== See also ==
- List of power stations in Kenya
