= Gulf Energy Thermal Power Station =

Kenyan heavy fuel oil-fired thermal power station

- Country: Kenya
- Location: Athi River
- Coordinates: 01°27′30″S 37°00′14″E
- Status: Operational
- Commission date: December 2014
- Owner: Gulf Energy Consortium'

Thermal power station
- Primary fuel: Heavy fuel oil

Power generation
- Nameplate capacity: 80.32 MW (107,710 hp)

Gulf Energy Thermal Power Station, also Athi River Thermal Power Station, is an 80.32 MW (107,710 hp), heavy fuel oil-fired thermal power station in Kenya.

This power station is one of about a dozen heavy fuel-fired power stations which offer the country backup capacity as standby plants that come on-line quickly, if and when geothermal and weather-dependent hydro-power fail to provide adequate supply to the national grid.

== Location ==
The power station is located in the town of Athi River, approximately 32 kilometres (20 mi) southeast of Nairobi, the capital and largest city of Kenya, along the Nairobi–Mombasa Road.

The coordinates of the power station are 1°27'30.0"S, 37°00'14.0"E (Latitude:-1.458333; Longitude:37.003889).

== Overview ==
The power station is owned and operated by Gulf Power Limited (GPL), a special purpose vehicle company created to own and operate the business. GPL is in turn owned by a consortium of independent power developers, including Gulf Energy Limited and Noora Power Limited, two companies incorporated in Kenya. In January 2019, Britam Holdings Limited, through its subsidiary, Britam Asset Managers Kenya Limited, acquired a stake in Gulf Energy Limited for a KSh1.4 billion (US$13.9 million) consideration.

The power generated by this power station is sold to Kenya Power and Lighting Company under a 20-year power purchase agreement, which expires in December 2034.

== Financing ==
This power station received funding from several international financiers including as illustrated in the table below:

Gulf Energy Thermal Power Station Financiers
Rank	Name of Lender	Loan Amount ($ million)	Percentage of Total
1	International Finance Corporation	21.7	19.38
2	Standard Bank of South Africa	21.7	19.38
3	OPEC Fund for International Development	31.6	28.21
4	Gulf Power Limited	37.0 (Equity)	29.64
	Total	112.00	100.00

== See also ==
- Kenya Power Stations
- Africa Power Stations
- World Power Stations
