= Meru Wind Power Station =

Wind farm in Kenya

- Location of Meru Wind Power Station in Kenya
- Country: Kenya
- Location: Meru, Meru County
- Coordinates: 00°19′47″N 37°35′30″E
- Status: Planned
- Commission date: 2017 (Expected)
- Owner: KenGen

Power generation
- Nameplate capacity: 400 MW (540,000 hp)

Meru Wind Power Station, also Meru Wind Farm, is a 400MW wind-powered power station, under construction in Kenya.

== Location ==
The power station is located in northwestern Meru County, near the Meru County–Isiolo County border, south of Isiolo Airport. This location lies approximately 274 kilometres (170 mi), by road, northeast of Nairobi, the capital and largest city in Kenya. The approximate coordinates of the power station are 0°19'47.0"N, 37°35'30.0"E (Latitude:0°19'47.0"N; Longitude:37°35'30.0"E).

== Overview ==
As part of efforts to diversify the national electricity sources, the government of Kenya plans to construct a 400 megawatt wind power station in Meru County. Kenya Electricity Generating Company, the government-controlled power generator will own and operate the power station. The first phase of this power station with generation capacity of 100MW was expected to come online in 2017, but delayed due to land disputes. An 80 MW combined wind, solar and battery project began construction in 2020.

== Development partners ==
The project's first phase with capacity of 100 megawatts will cost approximately US$270 million (KSh26.4 billion), borrowed from France’s Development Agency (AfD) and Germany’s Development Bank (KfW).

== See also ==
- List of power stations in Kenya
- Wind power in Kenya
