= Lamu Wind Power Station =

Wind farm in Kenya

- Location of Lamu Wind Power Station in Kenya
- Country: Kenya
- Location: Mpeketoni, Lamu County
- Coordinates: 02°24′59″S 40°44′32″E
- Status: Planned
- Commission date: 2020 (Expected)
- Owner: Kenwind Holdings

Wind farm
- Type: Onshore

Power generation
- Nameplate capacity: 90 MW (120,000 hp)

Lamu Wind Power Station, also Lamu Wind Farm, is a planned 90 MW (120,000 hp) wind-powered power station in Kenya.

== Location ==
The power station would be located in Baharini Village, near the town of Mpeketoni, in Lamu County, approximately 20 kilometres (12 mi) west of the location of Port Lamu. This is approximately 100 kilometres (62 mi), by road, east of the town of Garsen, which is located on the Mombasa–Garissa Road (B8 Road Kenya).

The plan involves the construction of 38 turbines on a piece of real estate measuring 3,206 acres (5.009 mi^{2}). The project is expected to displace over 600 families, who will be compensated to relocate.

== Overview ==
As part of efforts to diversify the energy sources in Kenya, Kenwinds Holdings, a private company, plans to establish a 90 MW wind farm in Mpeketoni Division at the Kenyan coast in Lamu County. The planned wind station will sit on 3,200 acres (5.0 mi^{2}) of land and consist of 38 wind turbines. The power generated will be evacuated via a new 323 kilometres (201 mi), 220 kV power line from Lamu to Rabai, where it will be integrated into the national grid.

== Development partners ==
The power station will be owned and operated by Kenwind Holdings Limited, a Kenyan corporation. Kenwind Holdings is a subsidiary of Electrawinds, a Belgian energy company, which is collaborating on the project. The International Finance Corporation, a branch of the World Bank is providing a portion of the budgeted US$235 million financing.

== Land dispute ==
In March 2017, Cordisons International Limited, an American wind-energy developer, went to court to challenge Kenwind Holdings Limited's right to the 11,000 acres (17 mi^{2}) piece of property on which the development will sit. In May 2018, Kenwind Holdings Limited, the Belgian company, prevailed in court and retained the rights to develop this power station.

== Recent developments ==
In February 2020, the developers of this power station signed a 20-year power purchase agreement with Kenya Power and Lighting Company, the country's electricity transmission and distribution monopoly. The electricity is expected to cost US$0.07 per kilowatt-hour (kWh).

== See also ==
- List of power stations in Kenya
- Wind power in Kenya
