= Ngong Hills Wind Power Station =

Wind power station in Kenya

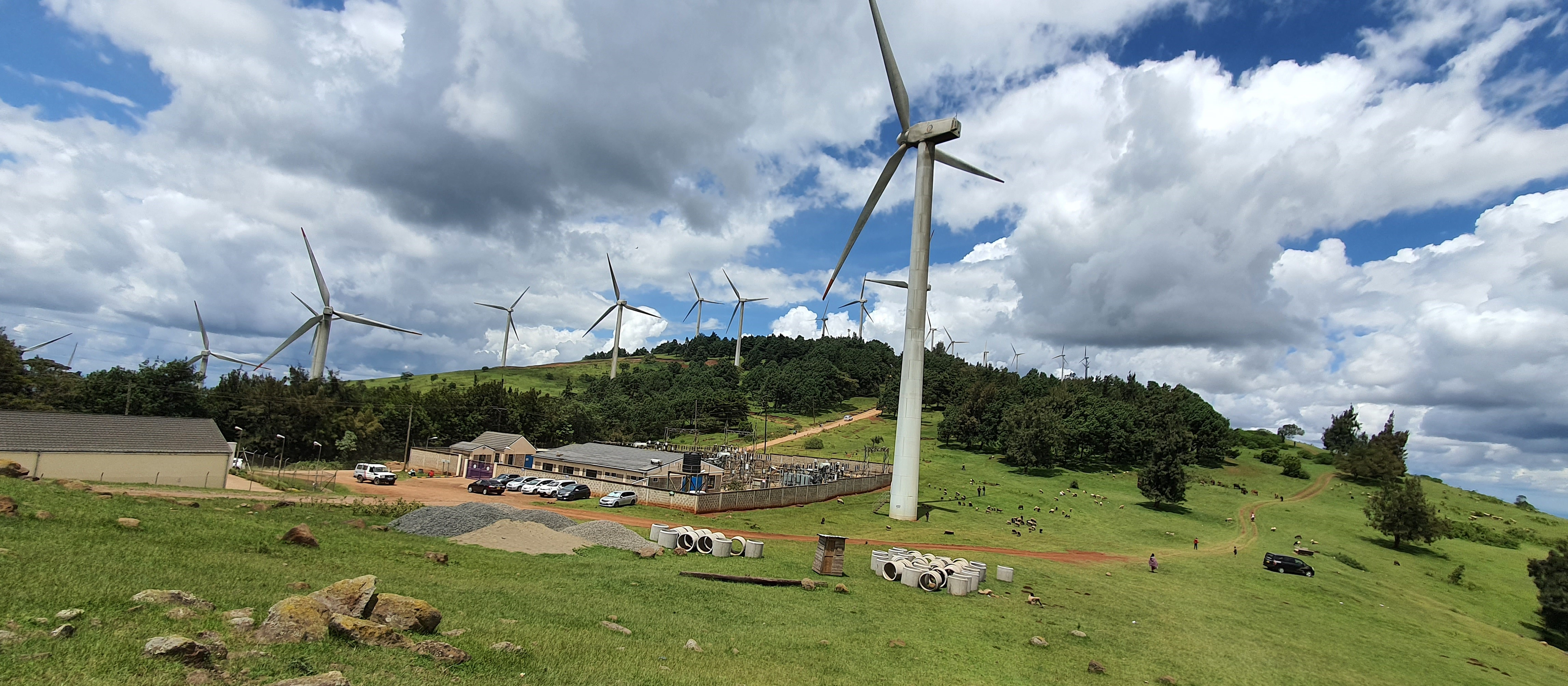
- Location of Ngong Hills Wind Power Station in Kenya
- Country: Kenya
- Location: Ngong, Kajiado County
- Coordinates: 01°22′52″S 36°38′08″E
- Status: Operational
- Commission date: 1993
- Owner: Kenya Electricity Generating Company
- Operator: Kenya Electricity Generating Company

Power generation
- Nameplate capacity: 25.5 MW

External links
- Commons: Related media on Commons

Ngong Hills Wind Power Station, also Ngong Hills Wind Farm, is a wind-powered power station in Kenya.

== Location ==
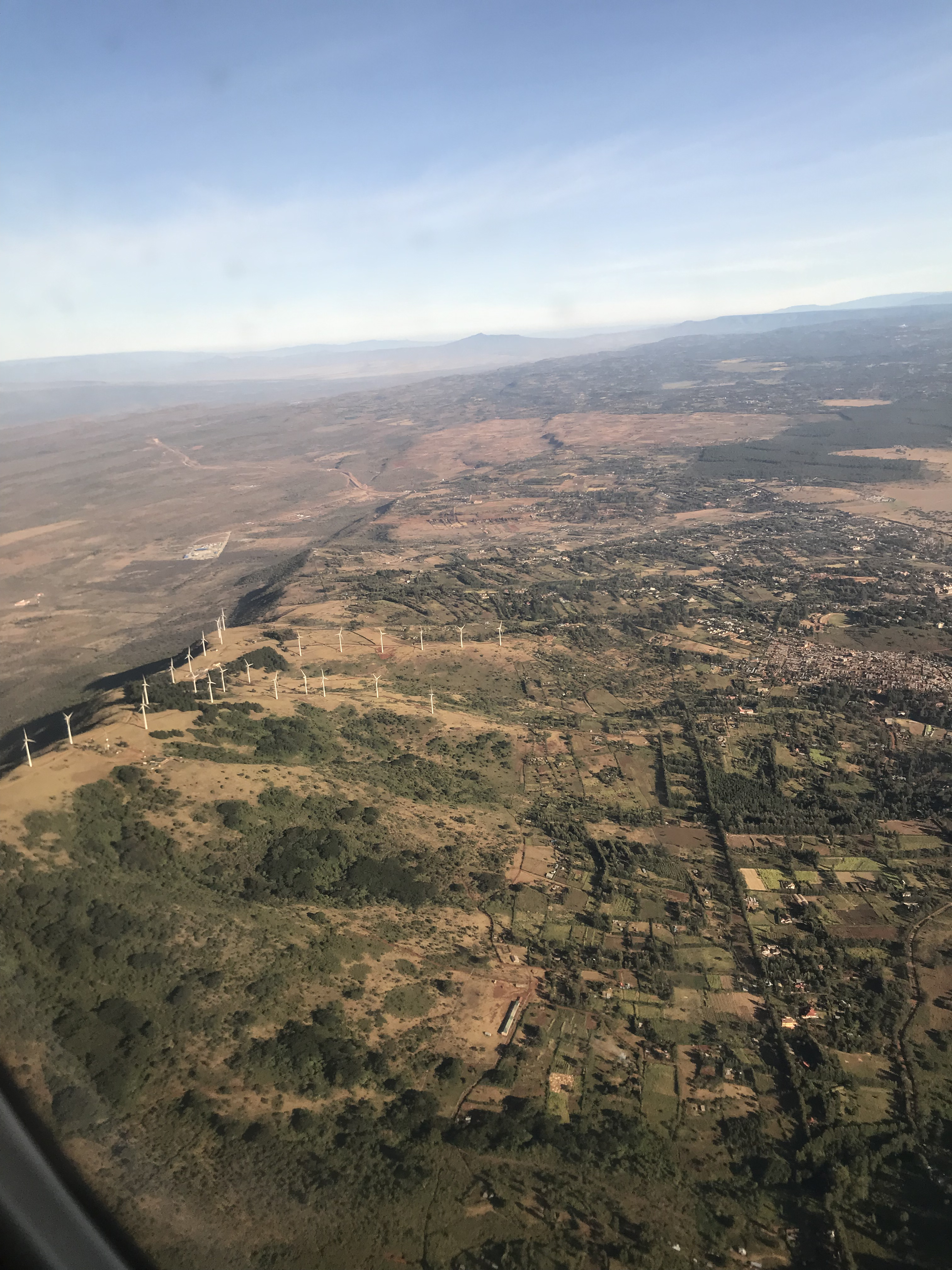
Ngong Hills Wind Power Station

The power station is located in the northern foothills of Ngong Hills, near the town of Ngong, in Kajiado County, approximately 35 kilometres (22 mi), by road, southwest of Nairobi, the capital and largest city in Kenya. The coordinates of the power station are:1°22'51.9"S, 36°38'08.0"E (Latitude:-1.381071; Longitude:36.635542). The wind is strongest in the evening and in March, and weakest in the morning and in July, contrasting with Lake Turkana Wind Power Station.

== History ==
Ngong Hills Power Station was initially commissioned in 1993 with two wind turbines donated by the government of Belgium. After those two turbines were retired, the installation of new hardware led to a second commissioning in August 2009, with capacity of 5.1 MW. Beginning in 2013, Kenya Electricity Generating Company, who own and operate the wind farm and power station began adding new turbines and by 2015, when the work was completed, the power station's generation capacity had increased to 25.5 megawatts.

== See also ==
- List of power stations in Kenya
- Wind power in Kenya
- Lake Turkana Wind Power Station
- Kinangop Wind Park
