= Savannah Tarka Wind Power Station =

Wind farm in Niger

- Country: Niger
- Location: Tarka, Tahoua Department, Tahoua Region, Niger
- Coordinates: 14°54′13″N 05°12′06″E
- Status: Proposed
- Commission date: 2025 Expected
- Owner: Savannah Energy

Power generation
- Nameplate capacity: 250MW

The Savannah Tarka Wind Power Station (French: Parc Eolien de la Tarka), also Tarka Wind Power Station, is a planned 250 megawatts wind power energy project, in Niger. The power station is owned and under development by Savannah Parc Eolien de la Tarka (SPET), a subsidiary of independent power producer (IPP), Savannah Energy, with headquarters in the United Kingdom. The wind farm is the first large-scale, grid-ready wind power station in the country and one of the largest in sub-Saharan Africa. Under a long-term power purchase agreement (PPA), the energy generated here will be sold to Société nigérienne d’électricité (NIGELEC), for integration into the Nigerien grid and possibly for sale to the country's neighbors.

== Location ==
The wind farm would be located in the community of Tarka, near the city of Tahoua, the capital of Tahoua Department and Tahoua Region, in southwestern Niger. Tahoua is located approximately 563 kilometres (350 mi) northeast of Niamey, the capital city of Niger.

== Overview ==
The planned generation capacity of this wind farm is 250 megawatts. The design calls for 60 wind turbines. A feasibility study that is planned before 2023, is expected to inform the exact layout of the farm and may adjust the capacity and number turbines. In March 2022, Savannah Energy received authorization from the government of Niger to proceed with the feasibility study. NIGELEC, the national electricity utility parastatal company will buy the energy generated at this power station, under a long-term PPA.

== Developers ==
Savannah Energy, based in the United Kingdom is the owner of the solar farm, thorough its subsidiary Savannah Parc Eolien de la Tarka (SPET).

== Funding ==
Savannah Energy plans to fund this renewable energy infrastructure project from internal sources and "project-specific" loans.

== Timeline ==
Feasibly and ESIA studies are expected to last until 2023. Construction is planned o begin in 2023, with commercial commissioning expected in 2025.

== Other considerations ==
Savannah Tarka Wind Power Station is expected to add 600 GWh of clean electricity annually to the electric grid of Niger. This will save the country over 400,000 tonnes of carbon dioxide emissions every year. This projects is expected to create 500 jobs during the construction phase.

== See also ==
- List of power stations in Niger
- Lake Turkana Wind Power Station
