= Sondu Miriu Hydroelectric Power Station =

- Location within Kenya
- Country: Kenya
- Coordinates: 0°20′33″S 34°51′08″E
- Purpose: Power
- Status: Operational
- Construction began: 1999
- Opening date: 2007; 19 years ago
- Owner: Kenya Electricity Generating Company

Dam and spillways
- Impounds: Sondu River

Sondu Miriu Hydroelectric Power Station
- Operator: Kenya Electricity Generating Company
- Commission date: 24 July 2009
- Type: Run-of-the-river
- Turbines: 2 X 30MW
- Installed capacity: 60 MW (80,000 hp)

The Sondu Miriu Hydroelectric Power Station is a hydroelectric power station on the Sondu River in Kenya.

== Location ==
The power station is located near the village of Kusa in Kisumu County, approximately 55 kilometres (34 mi), by road, southeast of Kisumu, the location of the county headquarters. This lies approximately 350 kilometres (217 mi), by road, northwest of Nairobi, the capital and largest city in the country. The coordinates of the power station are:0°20'33.0"S, 34°51'08.0"E (Latitude:0°20'33.0"S; Longitude:34°51'08.0"E).

== Overview ==
The power station is unique because it is not located directly on the river from which it derives the water that powers it. At the intake point, water is diverted to the power station, via a 6.2 kilometres (3.9 mi) intake tunnel. After the power is generated, the water effluent is discarded about 13 kilometres (8 mi) downstream of the intake point via an outlet channel that measures 4.7 kilometres (3 mi). A 50 kilometres (31 mi) 135kV transmission line carries the power from the power station to a substation in Kisumu, where it is integrated into the national electricity grid. Construction lasted 10 years, with a loan from the Japan Bank for International Cooperation at a total cost of Sh19 billion (US$249 million).

== Other considerations ==
After Sondu Miriu was built, another associated power station, the 20.2 MW (27,100 hp) Sang'oro Hydroelectric Power Station, was built between 2007 and 2013, using the water discharge from Sondu Miriu as its intake.

== Ownership ==
Sondu Miriu Hydroelectric Power Station is 100 percent owned by Kenya Electricity Generating Company, a parastatal company of the government of Kenya.

== See also ==
- List of power stations in Kenya
