= Menengai III Geothermal Power Station =

Geothermal power station in Kenya

- Location of Menengai III Geothermal Power Station
- Country: Kenya
- Location: Menengai, Nakuru County, Kenya
- Coordinates: 00°11′44″S 36°03′28″E
- Status: Operational
- Commission date: August 2023
- Construction cost: US$79.15 million
- Owner: Sosian Energy Limited

Power generation
- Nameplate capacity: 35 MW (47,000 hp)

The Menengai III Geothermal Power Station is a 35 MW (47,000 hp) geothermal power plant in Kenya. The power station reached full commercial commissioning in August 2023.

== Location ==
The power plant is located in the Menengai Crater, approximately 30 kilometres (19 mi), north of Nakuru, the location of the district headquarters. This is approximately 185 kilometres (115 mi) by road, northwest of Nairobi, the capital and largest city in Kenya. The coordinates of Menengai III Geothermal Power Station were:0°11'44.0"S, 36°03'28.0"E (Latitude:-0.195556; Longitude:36.057778).

== Overview ==
Geothermal Development Company (GDC), a geothermal development company, wholly owned by the Kenyan government has drilled geothermal wells in the Menengai Crater, whose total capacity can generate up to 130 MW (170,000 hp) of electric energy. GDC will sell the steam to three independent power producers (IPPs) to build three geothermal power stations, each with capacity of 35 MW (47,000 hp). The power stations are:

1. Menengai I Geothermal Power Station - Owned by Orpower Twenty Two
2. Menengai II Geothermal Power Station - Owned by Globeleq
3. Menengai III Geothermal Power Station - Owned by Sosian Energy

The Menengai IPP power projects were expected to come online during the second half of 2017.

== Ownership ==
Menengai III Geothermal Power Station is owned by Sosian Energy Limited, a Kenyan independent power producer (IPP). Sosian Energy selected Kaishan Renewable Energy Development, a subsidiary of Zhejiang Kaishan Compressor, a Chinese construction conglomerate, to build its geothermal power plant.

== Developments ==
In March 2022, the Narendra Raval, a wealthy Kenyan industrialist and business mogul, divested from Sosian Menengai Geothermal Power Limited, a Kenyan independent power producer (IPP) which owns a concession contract to build the 35 megawatts Menengai III Geothermal Power Station. The ownership was sold to Gideon Moi, a son of the late Daniel arap Moi, the second president of Kenya, at an undisclosed monetary consideration.

In April 2022, the African Development Bank (AfDB), which was considering funding this renewable energy infrastructure, withdrew its support for the project and insisted on "change of ownership" before it would consider proving financing.

In July 2024, the Development Bank of Southern Africa (DBSA), agreed to lend US$68 million towards the development of this renewable energy infrastructure project. The 12-year loan facility is expected to help Sosian expand capacity from 35 MW to 45 MW.

== Construction and commissioning ==
In June 2023, Kenyan media reported that the construction budget for this power station is estimated at US$79.15 million. On 8 June 2023, the station started to supply power to Kenya Power and Lighting Company, the off-taker. By the end of that month, the power station was expected to supply 22 MW to the Kenyan national grid.

A 25-year power purchase agreement between Sosian Energy and Kenya Power is expected to start applying when the power station reaches full commercial commissioning, expected during the second half of 2023. The power station achieved full commercial commissioning in August 2023. In August 2024, Kenyan online media reported that the steam needed to generate the electric power at this station costs US$14.5 million every year. It costs Sosian Energy US$0.08 to produce one kilowatt-hour (kWh) of electricity at Menengai III Geothermal Power Station.

== See also ==
- List of power stations in Kenya
- Geothermal power in Kenya
