= Menengai II Geothermal Power Station =

Building in Kenya

- Location of Menengai II Geothermal Power Station
- Country: Kenya
- Location: Menengai, Nakuru County, Kenya
- Coordinates: 00°11′46″S 36°03′47″E
- Status: Under construction
- Commission date: 2025 (Expected)
- Construction cost: US$117+ million
- Owner: Globeleq

Power generation
- Nameplate capacity: 35 MW (47,000 hp)

Menengai II Geothermal Power Station is a 35 MW (47,000 hp) geothermal power station under construction in Kenya. The power station is owned and under development by Globeleq, an independent power producer headquartered in London, United Kingdom. Globeleq is 70 percent owned by British International Investment and 30 percent by Norfund.

== Location ==
The power station is located in the Menengai Crater, approximately 30 kilometres (19 mi) north of Nakuru, the district headquarters, and approximately 185 kilometres (115 mi) northwest of Nairobi, the capital and largest city in Kenya. The coordinates of Menengai Crater are:0°11'46.0"S, 36°03'47.0"E (Latitude:-0.196105; Longitude:36.063062).

== Overview ==
Geothermal Development Company (GDC), a company wholly owned by the Kenyan government, has drilled geothermal wells in the Menengai Crater, whose total capacity can generate up to 130 MW (170,000 hp) of electric energy. GDC will sell the steam to three independent power producers to build three geothermal power stations, each with capacity of 35 MW (47,000 hp). The power stations are:

1. Menengai I Geothermal Power Station - Owned by Orpower Twenty Two
2. Menengai II Geothermal Power Station - Owned by Globeleq
3. Menengai III Geothermal Power Station - Owned by Sosian Energy

== Ownership ==
Menengai II Geothermal Power Station, whose construction costs were originally budgeted at KSh4 billion (approx. US$40 million), was owned by Quantum Power East Africa, an independent power producer. In February 2021, Quantum Power East Africa was majority acquired by Globeleq, a subsidiary of the CDC Group, today British International Investment.

== Construction and timeline ==
In June 2023, the foundation stone for the power station was laid by Rigathi Gachagua the vice-president of Kenya and Jane Marriott, the British High Commissioner to Kenya. The engineering, procurement and construction contractor was revealed to be a consortium comprising Toyota Tsusho Corporation and Fuji Electric, both of Japan. Construction is anticipated to conclude in 2025.

== Cost and funding ==
In June 2023, the cost of construction was reported as US$108 million. Partial funding to the tune of US$72 million has been granted to Globeleq by several financial institutions, including the African Development Bank (AfDB), the Trade and Development Bank (TDB) and the Finnish Fund for Industrial Cooperation Limited (FinnFund). A 25-year power purchase agreement has been signed between Globeleq the independent power producer and Kenya Power and Lighting Company, the off-taker.

In January 2024, the project reached financial closure. AfDB, FinnFund and TDB jointly provided US$117 million for this renewable energy project. Construction, which started in 2023, is expected to conclude in 2025.

== See also ==
- List of power stations in Kenya
- Geothermal power in Kenya
