= Turkana jet =

Atmospheric wind phenomenon in Eastern Africa

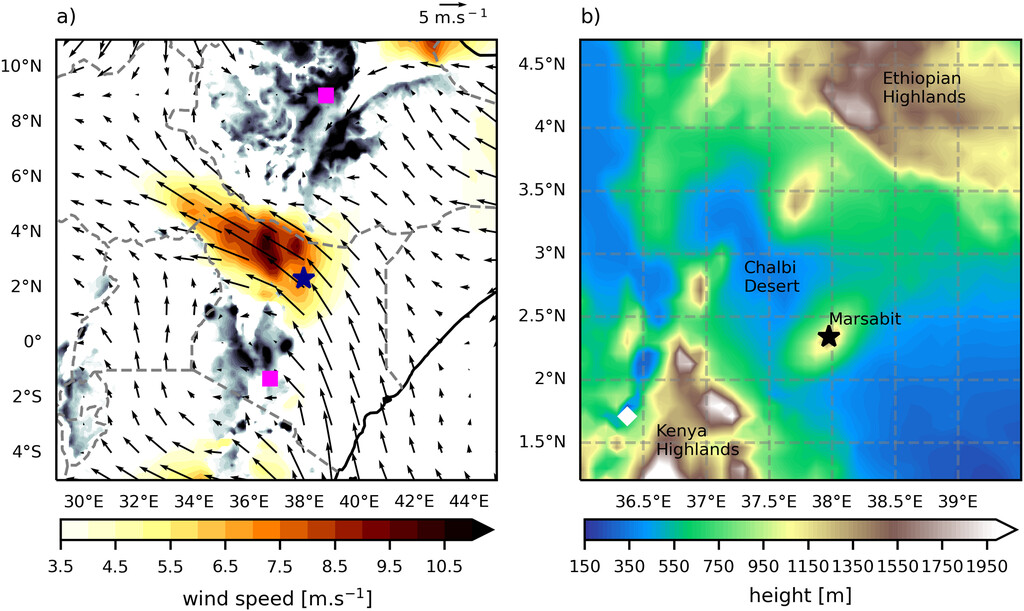
- Winds associated with the Turkana Jet and surrounding area (left), along with a map of regional terrain (right).
- Area of occurrence: Kenya to South Sudan
- Season: Throughout the year

The Turkana jet is a low-level, south-easterly mountain-gap wind flowing from Kenya to South Sudan. The jet passes through the Turkana channel between the Ethiopian and East African highlands. The Lake Turkana Wind Power Station (the largest wind farm in Africa, as of 2024) benefits from the semi-permanence of the jet throughout the year.

The jet was first presented in scientific literature by Kinuthia and Asnani in 1982 using measurements collected in Marsabit, Kenya. At Marsabit, the wind is strongest around 200–500 m above the ground, and has been known to reach speeds of 50 m/s. There is a variation in jet strength throughout the day, peaking between 00 and 06 UTC.

== Causes ==
The factors influencing the Turkana jet and its diurnal cycle are complex. The general wind flow is onto the African continent from the Indian Ocean in association with north-easterly or south-easterly Trade winds, depending on the time of year. The strong winds of the jet are a synoptic scale (~1000 km) feature, with jet entrance region near the Kenyan Coast (Garissa) and exit over South Sudan (near Juba).

Early modelling studies concluded that the jet forms as a result of orographic channelling (i.e. Bernoulli's principle). It has also been proposed that the night-time strengthening of the jet is a consequence of orographic downslope winds (i.e. Katabatic wind). Observations from the RIFTJet field campaign have been used to suggest that the jet strengthening overnight is a result of a more pronounced, and lower, elevated inversion (i.e. a stable layer of air) above the jet. However, the causal effect of this is not established.

== Characteristics ==
In 2021, scientists returned to take measurements at the Marsabit site where the jet was first measured. The scientists confirmed the existence of a persistent low-level jet. The jet formed every night of the campaign with an average low-level maximum wind speed of 16.8 m s^{−1} at 0300 local time. The measurements also highlighted a role for the Turkana jet in regional water vapour transport: the mean water vapour transport at Marsabit was found to be 172 kg m s^{−1}.

While direct measurements provide the most reliable estimates of wind in the jet and associated thermodynamic environment, these observations are rare, and are limited in spatial and time coverage. A number of studies have used atmospheric reanalysis data to look at the jet over its full area, and how that may have varied over recent decades. Findings support understanding of the controls on the jet with higher pressure gradient conditions associated with stronger wind speeds in the jet. In addition, stronger wind speeds are associated with drier conditions in the Turkana channel and surrounding mountains which enhance the night-time downslope winds that feed into the jet. Hartman additionally highlights the role of temperature gradients in providing a thermal forcing to jet wind.

High resolution atmospheric models have been used to simulate the jet, and the jet has even been studied in the coarsest climate models. An interesting finding from this work is that models at higher resolutions tend to simulate a closer match to observed wind speed and diurnal cycle.

== Associated weather and climate ==
Many scientists have noted connections between the Turkana jet and rainfall. These associations have been studied in the vicinity of the jet. In addition, wind-driven effects on Lake Turkana have been investigated. On a larger scale, simulations which block the water vapour transport associated with the Turkana Jet, demonstrate its importance for hydroclimate over parts of East and Central Africa.

There have also been investigations of how regional weather and climate relates to the jet. For example, connections between soil dryness and the jet speed have been presented. That same study highlighted how the soil conditions can enhance the effect of a large-scale atmospheric feature, the Madden–Julian oscillation, on the Turkana jet.

== Climate change ==
A study has looked at the response of the jet to climate change. This studied the pressure gradient force, which could be considered the driving force of the jet. The study found that in two relatively high resolution models (25 km and 4 km grid scales) the force increased with climate change. The result was a stronger wind speed in the lowest parts of the jet, but there was also a slight reduction in wind speeds in higher parts of the jet. The highest resolution model simulated the biggest increase in the pressure gradient. The future projection is in contrast to estimates of present day trends in reanalysis data, which suggest that the jet is weakening
