= Menengai I Geothermal Power Station =

Geothermal power station in Kenya

- Location of Menengai I Geothermal Power Station
- Country: Kenya
- Location: Menengai, Nakuru County, Kenya
- Coordinates: 00°11′53″S 36°03′58″E
- Status: Under construction
- Commission date: 2026 (Expected)
- Owner: Orpower Twenty Two

Power generation
- Nameplate capacity: 35 MW (47,000 hp)

The Menengai I Geothermal Power Station is a 35 MW (47,000 hp) geothermal power plant under construction in Kenya. The power station is owned and is being development by a consortium, which has formed a special vehicle company (SPV) to own, design, build, finance, operate and maintain the power station. For descriptive purposes, we will call that SPV Orpower Twenty Two (OP22). Kenya Power and Lighting Company, the off-taker together with OP22, the independent power producer (IPP), plan to sign a 20-year power purchase agreement.

== Location ==
The facility is located in the Menengai Crater, approximately 20 kilometres (12 mi), north of the city of Nakuru, where the county headquarters relocated. This is approximately 180 kilometres (112 mi), by road, northwest of Nairobi, the capital and largest city in Kenya. The coordinates of Menengai I Geothermal Power Station are: 0°11'53.0"S, 36°03'58.0"E (Latitude:-0.198056; Longitude:36.066111).

== Overview ==
Geothermal Development Company (GDC), a company wholly owned by the Kenyan government drilled geothermal wells in the Menengai Crater, whose total capacity can generate up to 105 MW (141,000 hp) of electric energy. GDC will sell the steam to three independent power producers (IPPs) to build three geothermal power stations, each with capacity of 35 MW (47,000 hp). The power stations are:

1. Menengai I Geothermal Power Station: Owned by Orpower Twenty Two 2. Menengai II Geothermal Power Station: Owned by Globelq and 3. Menengai III Geothermal Power Station: Owned by Sosian Energy.

Menengai I Geothermal Power Station uses new geothermal technology jointly developed by Toshiba Corporation and Ormat Technologies Inc to harness more energy from the steam supplied to the plant by increasing efficiency.

== Ownership ==
The power station is owned by a consortium (Orpower Twenty Two), whose shareholding is illustrated in the table below: Vital Capital based in Switzerland became a shareholder in 2018, after Israel's Ormat Technologies divested from the project in 2018.

Shareholding in Orpower Twenty Two
Rank	Name of Owner	Domicile	Percentage Ownership
1	Vital Capital	Switzerland	50.00
2	Symbion Power	United States	25.00
3	Civicon Limited	Kenya	25.00
	Total		100.00

== Developments ==
In January 2023, Kenyan media reported that Orpower 22, the SPV company that owns and is developing this power station had secured US$97 million in funding to build this power station. The source of funding was not disclosed.

== See also ==
- List of power stations in Kenya
- Geothermal power in Kenya
