= Eldosol Solar Power Station =

Kenyan power station

- Country: Kenya
- Coordinates: 00°25′32″N 35°21′37″E
- Status: Operational
- Construction began: 2018
- Commission date: August 2021

Solar farm
- Type: Flat-panel PV

Power generation
- Nameplate capacity: 40 megawatts (54,000 hp)
- Annual net output: 75 GWh

Eldosol Solar Power Station is a 40 megawatts (54,000 hp) solar power plant in Kenya, the largest economy in the East African Community.

== Location ==
The power station is located in Uasin Gishu County, in the Western part of Kenya, approximately 13 kilometres (8 mi) by road, south east of the city of Eldoret. This site lies adjacent to Radiant Solar Power Station.

== Overview ==
The power station has a capacity of 40 megawatts that is sold directly to the Kenya Power and Lighting Company for integration in the national electricity grid. The electricity is evacuated via a substation near the power station, connected to a high voltage transmission line that passes near the power station. The power station comprises 140,800 photovoltaic modules and a medium voltage step-up transformer (400V – 22kV). The anticipated annual electricity generation is 74,968,000 MWh.

== Developers ==
The power station was developed by a consortium comprising the entities listed in the table below. The developers also own the power station, as well as the adjacent 40 megawatt Radiant Solar Power Plant.

Eldosol Solar Power Station Ownership
Rank	Name of Owner	Percentage Ownership
1	Frontier Investment Management	
2	Selenkei Investment Limited	
3	Cedate Limited	
4	Interpro International LLC	
5	Paramount Universal Bank	
	Total	100.00

== Construction timeline, costs and funding ==
The cost of construction was budgeted at US$78 million (approx.€70 million). In 2018 the European Investment Bank approved a loan of €30 million (US$37.5 million) towards the construction of this power station. The developer/owners will raise the difference of €40 million (approximately US$45 million). An equal loan amount was also approved for Radiant Solar Power Station, by the same lender, on similar terms. The power station was initially expected to be commissioned before the end of 2019. However, commercial commissioning occurred in August 2021.

== See also ==
- List of power stations in Kenya
