= Paramount Universal Bank =

Commercial bank in Kenya

Paramount Bank
- Type: Private company
- Industry: Financial services
- Founded: 1993
- Headquarters: Nairobi, Kenya
- Products: Transaction accounts, Savings, Investments, Debit Cards
- Website: www.paramountbank.co.ke

Paramount Bank, is a commercial bank in Kenya. It is one of the forty-four commercial banks licensed by the Central Bank of Kenya, the national banking regulator.

Paramount Bank is a small retail bank in Kenya. As of December 2013, the bank was ranked number 37, by assets, out of 43 licensed commercial banks in the country. The bank is an active member of the MoneyGram money transfer network.

== History ==
The bank was established in 1993, as a deposit-taking, non-bank financial institution called Combined Finance Limited. The company's share capital at that time was approximately US$300,000 (KES:25 million). In 1995, after increasing its share capital and following the issuance of a commercial banking license, the company rebranded to Paramount Bank Limited, and began banking operations. In 2000, Paramount Bank merged with Universal Bank Limited to form Paramount Universal Bank.

== Ownership ==
As of August 2014, Paramount Universal Bank is a privately held company whose owners are not publicly known.

== Branch network ==
The bank maintains a network of branches at the following locations, as of January 2015:

1. Westlands Branch - Sound Plaza, Woodvale Grove, Westlands, Nairobi (main branch)
2. Parklands Branch - DIamond Plaza, Masari Rd, Highridge, Parklands, Nairobi
3. Kisumu Branch - Tuffoam Mall, Achieng' Oneko Rd, Kisumu
4. Koinange Street Branch - Paramount Bank House, Koinange Street, Nairobi
5. Mombasa Branch - Nyali Center, Links Road, Mombasa
6. Eldoret Branch - Karims Hardware Building, Oloo Street, Eldoret
7. Industrial area Branch - Dar es Salaam Road Nairobi

== See also ==
- List of banks in Kenya
- Central Bank of Kenya
- Economy of Kenya
