= Garissa Solar Power Station =

Solar power plant in Kenya

- Country: Kenya
- Location: Garissa, Garissa District
- Coordinates: 0.34000°S 39.60078°E
- Status: Operational
- Construction began: 2017
- Commission date: 2018
- Owner: Kenya Rural Electrification Authority

Solar farm
- Type: Flat-panel PV

Power generation
- Nameplate capacity: 55 MW (74,000 hp)

Garissa Power Station is a 55 MW (74,000 hp) solar power plant in Kenya.

== Location ==
The power station is located in Garissa County about 20 kilometres (12 mi), north of the town of Garissa. This is approximately 385 kilometres (239 mi) by road, north-east of Nairobi, the country's capital and largest city.

== Overview ==
The solar farm sits on 85 hectares (210 acres) and consists of 200,200 solar panels and is expected to be the largest in East and Central Africa. It is expected to create about 1,000 jobs during the construction period. The power from this power station is enough to power about 625,000 homes.

The power station is owned and operated by Kenya Rural Electrification Authority, a government agency. The power generated will be sold to Kenya Power and Lighting for integration into the national grid. In February 2018, the Business Daily Africa, reported that the expected commissioning of this power plant had been pushed back to December 2018, following delays. The solar park sells electricity wholesale to Kenya Power at Sh5.49 per unit. The power purchase agreement, signed in September 2016, calls for Kenya Power to sell electricity from the solar plant at KSh12 (US$0.12) per kilowatt hour, approximately KSh8 cheaper than diesel-generated electricity.

== Construction timeline, costs, and funding ==
China Jiangxi, a Chinese construction company was awarded the construction contract at a budgeted cost of KSh13.7 billion ($135.7 million), borrowed from Exim Bank of China. Construction was expected to begin in the fourth quarter of 2016 and was expected to last one year. Due to prolonged negotiations in securing a power purchase agreement from Kenya Power and Lighting, construction of this project was delayed. As of February 2018, commissioning of the power station was expected in December 2018. In August 2018, The EastAfrican reported that the new commissioning date had been brought forward to September 2018. The solar power plant was officially launched by President Uhuru Kenyatta on December 13, 2019.

== See also ==
- List of power stations in Kenya
- Energy in Kenya
