= Radiant Solar Power Station =

Kenyan power station

- Approximate location of Radiant Solar Power Station
- Country: Kenya
- Coordinates: 00°25′32″N 35°21′40″E
- Status: Operational
- Construction began: 2018
- Commission date: August 2021
- Owner: Radiant Energy

Solar farm
- Type: Flat-panel PV

Power generation
- Nameplate capacity: 40 megawatts (54,000 hp)
- Annual net output: 75 GWh

Radiant Solar Power Station is a 40 megawatts (54,000 hp) solar power plant in Kenya.

== Location ==
The power station is located in Uasin Gishu County, in the Western part of Kenya, approximately 13 kilometres (8 mi) by road, south east of the city of Eldoret. This site lies adjacent to Eldosol Solar Power Station.

== Overview ==
The power station has a capacity of 40 megawatts, that is sold directly to the Kenya Power and Lighting Company for integration in the national electricity grid. The electricity is evacuated via a substation near the power station, connected to a high voltage transmission line that passes near the power station. The power shares a common substation with the neighboring Eldosol Solar Power Station. The power is sold at KSh12.36 (US$0.1236) per kilowatthour (kWh) under Kenya's feed-in-tariff for solar power.

== Developers ==
The power station was developed by a consortium comprising the entities listed in the table below. The developers also own the power station, as well as the adjacent 40 megawatt Eldosol Solar Power Plant.

Eldosol Solar Power Station Ownership
Rank	Name of Owner	Percentage Ownership
1	Frontier Investment Management	
2	Selenkei Investment Limited	
3	Cedate Limited	
4	Interpro International LLC	
5	Paramount Universal Bank	
	Total	100.00

== Construction timeline, costs and funding ==
The cost of construction was budgeted at US€70 million (approx. KSh7.84 billion). In 2018, the European Investment Bank approved a loan of €30 million (KSh3.36 billion) towards the construction of this power station. The developer/owners raised the difference of €40 million (approx. KSh4.48 billion). An equal loan amount was also approved for Eldosol Solar Power Station, by the same lender, on similar terms. This power station reached commercial commissioning in August 2021.

== See also ==
- List of power stations in Kenya
