= Lake Turkana Wind Power Station =

Wind farm in Kenya

Lake Turkana Wind Power Project
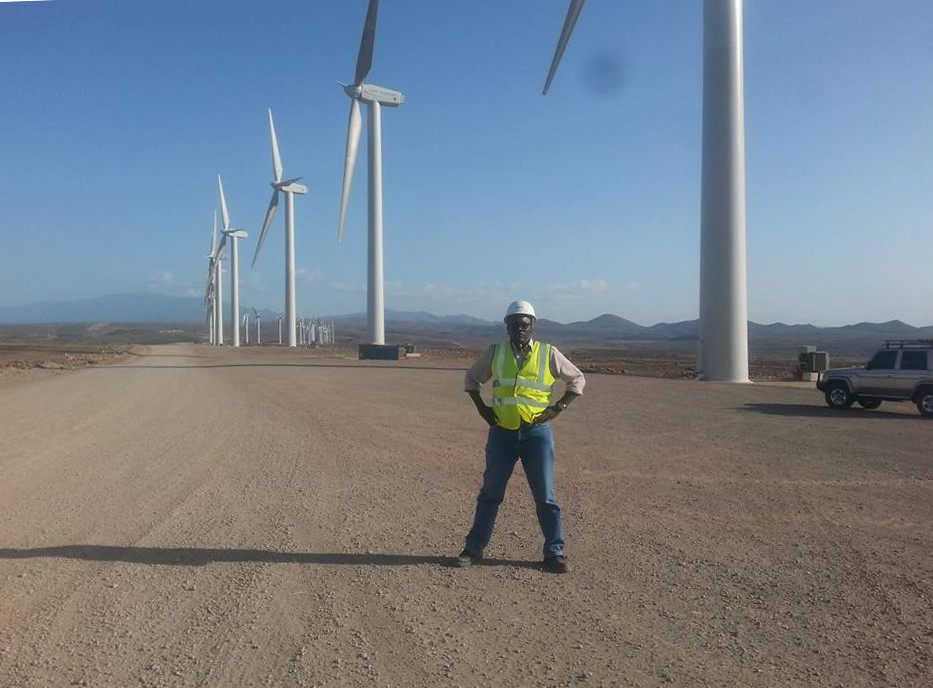
- Country: Kenya
- Location: Loyangalani, Marsabit County, Kenya
- Coordinates: 02°30′44″N 36°49′00″E
- Status: Operational
- Commission date: October 2018
- Owner: Lake Turkana Wind Power Limited

Power generation
- Units operational: 365
- Nameplate capacity: 310.25 MW (416,050 hp)

External links
- Website: ltwp.co.ke
- Commons: Related media on Commons

Lake Turkana Wind Power Project (LTWP) is a wind farm in Kenya. It is located in Loiyangalani District, in Marsabit County, approximately 545 kilometres (339 mi) by road north of Nairobi, Kenya's capital city. This wind farm location benefits from a persistent wind phenomenon called the Turkana jet.

The wind farm covers 160 square kilometres (40,000 acres) and has a capacity of 310 MW, enough to supply one million homes. It comprises 365 wind turbines, each with a capacity of 850 kilowatts. The associated overhead electric grid distribution system and a high voltage substation that connect it to the national grid.

The KSh70 billion wind farm is the single largest private investment in Kenya’s history and the biggest farm in Africa. The power produced is bought at a fixed price by Kenya Power (KPLC) over a 20-year period in accordance with the Power Purchase Agreement (PPA) with the latter. The project was completed in January 2017, however the line evacuating the power generated was not completed until July 2019.

== Location ==
The wind farm is located approximately 50 kilometres (31 mi), north of the town of South Horr, in Loyiangalani sub-county, in the extreme western part of Marsabit County, in the former Eastern Province. This location lies approximately 194 kilometres (121 mi), by road, west of Marsabit, where the county headquarters are located. The geographical coordinates of the wind farm are: 02°30'44.0"N, 36°49'00.0"E (Latitude:2.512222; Longitude:36.816667). The wind is strongest in the morning and in October, and weakest in the afternoon and in February, contrasting with Ngong Hills Wind Power Station.

=== Land rights ===
The project is on trust land owned by local authorities, used by indigenous pastoralists. This means that all the land is held by the relevant local authority, ostensibly in trust for the local inhabitants. The tribes that communally use land in this area include El Molo, Rendille, Samburu, Turkana and other indigenous and pastoralist communities in the South-East of Marsabit County.

== History ==
LTWP was created in 2006 out of the partnering of Anset Africa Limited (a company involved in project development and management in the areas of tourism, biogas energy, telecommunications, solid waste management, and road construction) and KP&P (a company that develops and operates wind energy projects). In 2005, discussions with the Kenyan government began regarding the development of a wind power project near to Lake Turkana and as a result, extensive wind assessments were conducted. Later in 2007 environmental fieldwork was undertaken. A Memorandum of Understanding (MOU) was signed between LTWP and Kenya Power on 10 April 2008. Land permits IR Number 6395/1 (L.R. 28031) and IR Number 6396/1 (L.R. 28031/2) were signed with the Kenyan government in March 2009, which caused problems when local communities only came to know the plans in April 2014. Construction began in October 2014 and was expected to be completed in June 2017. In March 2016, the first shipment of 30 wind turbines arrived in the country, in anticipation of the first 50 MW coming online in September 2016. At 9 March 2017, Lake Turkana Wind Power Station was ready to produce 33% of the targeted of 310 MW. At that time, all 365 wind turbines had been erected.

On 19 July 2019, Uhuru Kenyatta, the president of Kenya, officially commissioned the 438 kilometres (272 mi), 400kV Loiyangalani-Suswa High Voltage Power Line that transmits the generated power for integration into the national grid. At that time, the power station was averaging generation of 199 megawatts (64 percent of its installed capacity of 310.25 megawatts).

== Specification ==
The wind farm site, covers approximately 160 square kilometres (40,000 acres). The farm has 365 turbines (type Vestas V52), each with capacity of 850 kW. The V52 had gone out of production, but was updated with nested towers for transport on the 1,200 kilometres (746 mi) road from Mombasa port, of which 200 kilometres (124 mi) are new gravel roads.

The power generated from the wind turbines will be transmitted via 33 kV overhead electric wires to a substation which will be located on the premises. From the substation, power will be transmitted via a 400 kV high voltage electric power lines to a substation in Suswa, approximately 520 kilometres (320 mi), south of Loyangalani, where it will be integrated into the national power grid. The electricity will be bought by Kenya Power at a fixed price for 20 years from the time of commissioning. As part of the development, the road from Laisamis to the project site, a distance of approximately 195 kilometres (121 mi), is slated to be upgraded. Construction began in 2015 and full operation is expected to commence in 2018. As of April 2015, construction had begun. The first 90 MW was expected online in October 2016 with full commissioning of the full 300 MW planned for July 2017.

== Developers and funding ==
The company that owns and is developing the wind farm is called Lake Turkana Wind Power Limited. The consortium which owns LTWP Limited includes the following entities:

Equity partners

- KP&P BV Africa
- Aldwych International Limited
- Norfund
- Investment Fund for Developing Countries (IFU) of Denmark
- FinnFund
- Other Equity Partners
- Wind Power A.S. (Vestas) - turbine supplier (to be transferred to Google; which is to pay US$40 million for a 12.5 percent shareholding in the power project, once up and running).

In February 2020, it became public that Google Inc. would not become an investor in the project. Vestas, the Danish turbine supplier, which owns 12.5 percent of the holding company, said in Danish media that delays in completing the high voltage transmission line led to the cancellation of the transfer contract in 2019.

Financial partners

The lead arranger for the US$853.12 million syndicated financing package is the African Development Bank, with Standard Bank and Nedbank Capital of South Africa as co-arrangers. The following have provided financing to the project.

- African Development Bank
- Standard Bank of South Africa
- Nedbank Capital
- Norfund
- European Investment Bank
- Netherlands Development Finance Company
- PROPARCO
- East African Development Bank
- Trade and Development Bank
- German Investment Corporation
- Triodos Bank
- EKF Bank
- Overseas Private Investment Corporation

Donors

The following entities made outright donations to the project:

- Government of the Netherlands – €10 million
- EU Africa Infrastructure Trust Fund (part of the European Commission) – €25 million

=== Transmission line and substation ===
In 2010, the Spanish government offered to finance the construction of a 427 km double circuit transmission line southwards from the site to Suswa, approximately 100 km west of Nairobi. The US$150 million offer comprises:

- A 'concessional loan' of €55 million (US$74 million) at an interest of 0.10 percent, with a repayment period of 30 years, including a 14-year grace period. The loan will be supported by a 'Financial Co-operation Agreement' between Kenya’s Ministry of Finance and Spain’s Ministry of Industry, Tourism and Trade;
- €55 million in 'commercial credit' with support from the Spanish Export Credit Insurance Company on OECD terms;
- A 'sovereign guarantee' by the Kenyan Government.

This means that the Kenya Electricity Transmission Company (Ketraco), a Government-owned entity created in 2008, will also partly fund the transmission line and the substation by means of a tolling arrangement with Kenya Power. Spanish company Isolux Corsán won a US$208.1 million tender for this construction.

=== World Bank pulls out of project ===
LTWP suffered a setback in 2012 when the World Bank withdrew its support for the project. Bank officials were reported to have concerns that the electricity produced would outweigh demand. The World Bank Group’s country director in Kenya, Johannes Zutt, stated that Kenya could be left with excess power on the grid worth up to KSh8.5 billion (equivalent to US$100 million) per year. Originally, the project was expected to be fully operational by the end of 2014. From the project perspective, the withdrawal of the World Bank could be seen in a positive light as it allowed LTWP to move forward to financial close. A source at power transmission firm Ketraco indicated that the agency was happy with the World Bank’s decision to quit. "We are happy that the World Bank has withdrawn. They were putting a lot of hurdles in our way but now we can go ahead."

== Economic impacts ==
LTWP will be the largest single private investment in Kenya at the time it is made. LTWP claims the wind farm will reduce and possibly eliminate Kenya's dependency on diesel and heavy fuel power stations, however, this claim is unsubstantiated. Fuel imports to power thermal power stations cost the Kenyan taxpayer KSh17 billion (US$150 million) annually. It is anticipated that the project will contribute KSh3 billion (US$35 million) annually in tax revenue and KSh58.6 billion (US$673 million) over a period 20 years. During construction, approximately 2,500 workers will be hired. Once commissioned, the power station will employ 200 full-time staff.

=== Impacts on Kenyan State and consumers ===
The project is of significant strategic benefit to Kenya, and at KSh70 billion (€625 million) will be the largest single private investment in Kenya’s history. With a power tariff of 7.52 Euro cents per kWh (KSH11/kWh), LTWP is one of the lowest power tariffs in Kenya along with geothermal power at KSh9. Other prices are KSh3 for hydro power and KSh18 for oil. It is estimated that Kenya will save up to US$120 million a year in fuel cost by reducing reliance on diesel power plants. LTWP’s contract (Power Purchase Agreement) with government-owned Kenya Power obliges the utility to buy all electricity produced by the wind farm, even if it is not needed, or if more economic electricity sources are available; "The power produced will be bought at a fixed price by Kenya Power (KPLC) over a 20-year period in accordance with the signed Power Purchase Agreement (PPA)."

Furthermore, the Kenyan Government has signed guarantees with LTWP to cover costs in case Kenya Power cannot afford to pay for excess electricity for the duration of the PPA. In order to mitigate this risk the African Development Fund has provided a 'partial risk guarantee' up to the value of €20 million. The Kenyan Government is also liable for losses incurred by delay due to political causes or project failure, as happened with the power line. These costs, as well as the expenses for the transmission line, are therefore likely to be passed on to Kenyan taxpayers and electricity consumers on top of the electricity produced. Before the power station opened, some feared that this could result in higher prices for electricity users than previous rates.

For the fiscal year of 2019, Kenya Power paid KSh11 billion to LTWP for 1.1 TWh.

=== Grid stability ===
The LTWP project is of such a large scale that it will provide up to 20% of the Kenyan power grid’s capacity to absorb wind energy.

It is generally accepted in wind technology research that intermittent resources can destabilise a small grid such as that in Kenya, especially if it is concentrated all in one location. Denmark has over 19% wind power (wind capacity of 4,885MW) connected to the grid, but this capacity is supplied across thousands of projects. While LTWP aims to provide 310 MW of reliable, low cost wind power to the Kenya national grid, equivalent to approximately 18% of Kenya’ current installed electricity generating capacity. As of 2018, Kenya had a total installed capacity of 2300 MW, largely being generated by hydro (46.3%) and thermal (37.4%). The Government targets to increase generating capacity to 6762 MW in 2017. Kenya also plans to change the energy generation mix, with a view of reducing dependency on hydro and thermal. LTWP will play a key role in balancing the energy generation mix.

In January 2021 Clir Renewables, a Canadian software company based in Vancouver, British Columbia, signed a contract with LTWP, to optimise power generation at the power station. The software company will analyse data from each of the 365 turbines at the power station. Fluctuations in wind speed at each turbine will be detected and mapped. Causes of underperformance at each turbine will be identified and solutions suggested. The overall objective is to improve the efficiency of the power plant and improve power output and grid stability.

== Controversies ==
=== Indigenous rights issues ===
LTWP commenced its community engagement activities in 2005, nine years before construction started in October 2014.

Local Turkana communities filed a lawsuit against LTWP in October 2014 at Meru High Court, Kenya to nullify the titles obtained by the company and return the land to its original status as community land. In November 2016 Justice Peter Njoroge of the Meru High Court rejected the application filed by Marsabit residents, requesting the court to stop the Wind Power project.

In 2015 the intertribal Sarima Indigenous Peoples’ Land Forum (SIPLF) was created as an attempt to bring indigenous communities together in order to stop the wind power project. The forum is named after the village of Sarima that was displaced by the project. In their Declaration of 7th February 2015 the SIPLF stated the "El Molo, Rendille, Samburu, Turkana and other indigenous and pastoralist communities of Laisamis Constituency and Karare Ward, in Marsabit County, Northern Kenya, reject the illegal privatization of 610 square kilometres (150,000 acres) of our ancestral land by the European consortium 'Lake Turkana Wind Power Limited'".

The SIPLF stated they were not against wind farm development, if they own and lead the business: "We are determined to make this happen on the basis of our communities' ownership and leadership. We won't allow the theft of our land under any circumstance".

=== Social and Environmental Impacts ===
Negative social and environmental impacts have also been highlighted in LTWP’s own Environmental and Social Impact Assessment (ESIA) which would have serious implications for the social, cultural, economic and political well-being of the communities affected.

LTWP documents detail plans for the construction of a new "camp" for 2,500 construction site workers. LTWP states that these workers will be employed local workers, trained for the job. However, this part of Northern Kenya lacks enough people to provide the labour so LTWP will need to employ most of these workers from outside the local area.

According to the ESIA, there are a number of potential negative local impacts due to the arrival of the 2,500 workers and the construction work in general. These include: cultural contamination, increased risk of disease, community conflicts, challenges of labour force management, occupational hazards, increase in antisocial behavior, increased demand for wood resources in an area with an already "acute shortage", sanitation and waste disposal problems, and a decreased livestock grazing area.

However, the project's positive social impacts have outweighed the negative ones and the project continues to share project benefits with the local communities through its Winds of Change Foundation. Some locals were informed about the project in 2007, while others expressed a lack of information. 1180 people of the Sarima village were relocated and compensated with KSh13,000 (approximately €113), while Samburu people expressed appreciation of the project.

== Capacity charge ==
In August 2017, the Daily Nation reported that the owners of this power station had, in January 2017, started to bill the Kenya Power Company a monthly "capacity charge" of KSh700 million (approx. US$7 million), for power produced by the power station that cannot be evacuated due to lack of a high voltage line to transmit it to the substation at Suswa. Following negotiations, in September 2017, the government of Kenya agreed to pay the developers of Lake Turkana Wind Power station, a total of KSh5.7 billion (approx. US$55.83 million), in monthly installments, spread over a six-year period. The monthly payment will amount to KSh78,600,000 (approx. US$769,833). The monthly surcharge will be passed on to the consumers, beginning in May 2018, when the high-voltage power line is expected to be completed.

The transmission line was completed and connected to the national grid on 24 September 2018. The delays attracted total penalties of KSh14.5 billion (€127 million at that time). In a deal struck in 2017, Kenya committed to pay KSh5.7 billion (€46 million at the time) of the total penalty in lump sum, while the balance of KSh9.25 billion (€81 million under prevailing rates) was to be paid over a period of six years through a tariff increase to the electricity consumers.

== Developments ==
In March 2023, Afrk21.africa reported that the shareholding in the project, previously owned by Finnish Fund for Industrial Cooperation (Finnfund) had been sold to Climate Finance Partnership (CFP), that is managed by BlackRock Alternatives. At that time, other equity partners included (1) Vestas Wind Systems of Denmark (2) Anergi Turkana Investments of Turkey, which in 2021, acquired the shareholding previously owned by Norfund (3) Danish Climate Investment Fund (KIF), through the Investment Fund for Developing Countries (IFU) and (4) Sandpiper.

On 19 February 2024 Vestas Wind Systems announced it had completed the sale of its 12.5 percent share in Lake Turkana Wind Power Limited (LTWP). The shares have been acquired by the Climate Finance Partnership (CFP), which is managed by BlackRock, after CFP in March 2023 announced its intention to acquire the shares held by Vestas Eastern Africa Ltd.

== See also ==
- Additionality
- Clean Development Mechanism
- Constitution of Kenya
- Constitutional Reforms in Kenya
- Energy in Kenya
- Free, prior and informed consent
- Indigenous rights
- Lake Turkana
- List of power stations in Kenya
- Kinangop Wind Park
- Ngong Hills Wind Farm
- UN Declaration on the Rights of Indigenous Peoples
- UNFCCC
- Variability issues in wind power
- Wind power in Kenya
- Savannah Tarka Wind Power Station
