= Turkwel Hydroelectric Power Station =

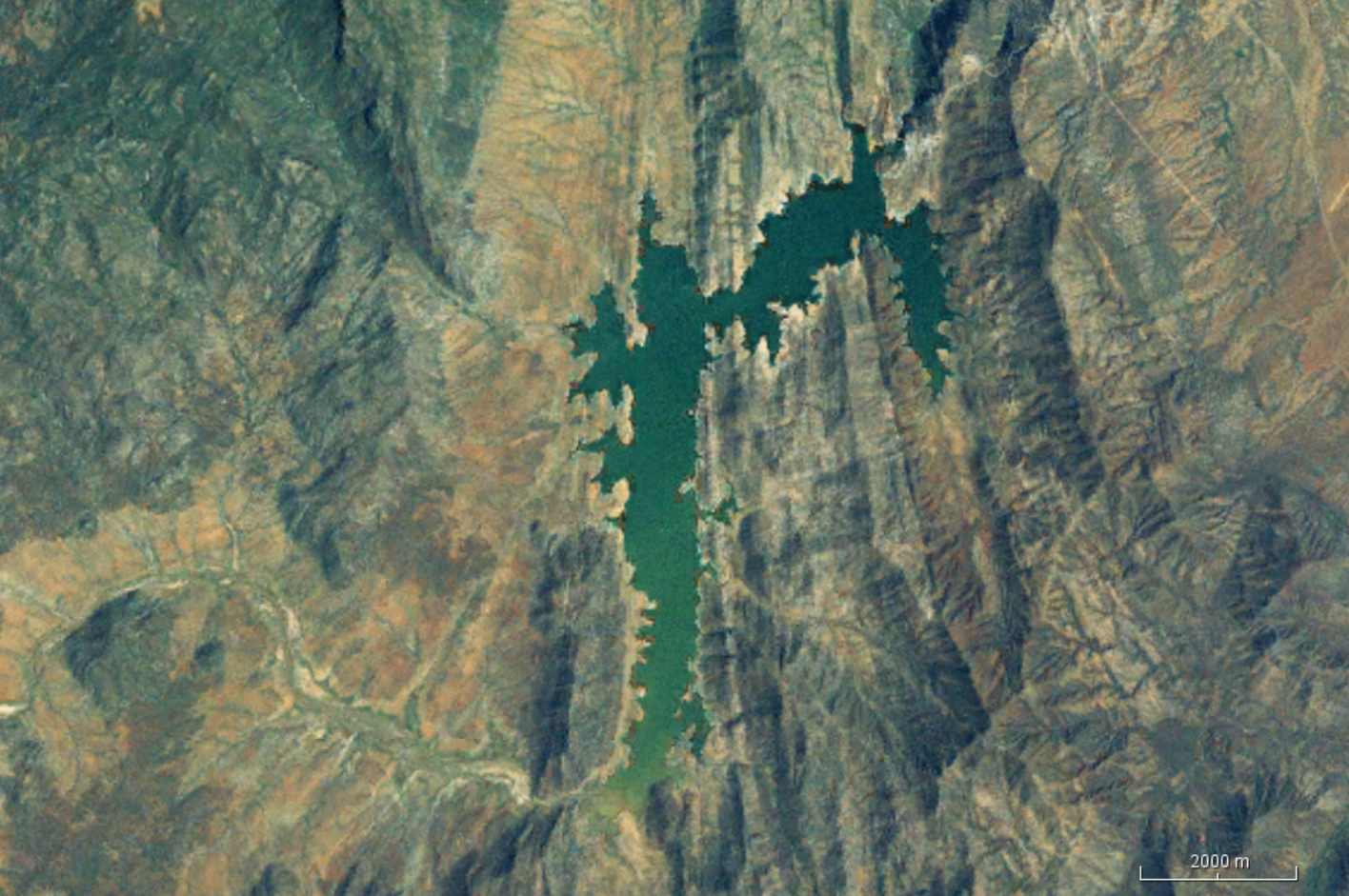

- Location within Kenya
- Country: Kenya
- Location: Lorokon, West Pokot County
- Coordinates: 1°53′53.47″N 35°20′1.34″E
- Purpose: Power, irrigation, fisheries
- Status: Operational
- Construction began: 1986
- Opening date: 1991; 35 years ago

Dam and spillways
- Type of dam: Arch
- Impounds: Turkwel River
- Height: 153 m (502 ft)
- Length: 150 m (490 ft)
- Dam volume: 170,000 m^{3} (220,000 cu yd)

Reservoir
- Creates: Turkwel Gorge Reservoir
- Total capacity: 1,641,000,000 m^{3} (1,330,000 acre⋅ft)

Turkwel Hydroelectric Power Station
- Coordinates: 1°55′16.85″N 35°21′31.79″E
- Operator: Kenya Electricity Generating Company
- Commission date: 1991
- Type: Conventional
- Hydraulic head: 356 m (1,168 ft)
- Turbines: 2 x 56 MW Francis-type
- Installed capacity: 106 MW (142,000 hp)

The Turkwel Hydroelectric Power Station, also Turkwel Dam, is an arch dam on the Turkwel River about 76 km (47 mi) north of Lorokon in West Pokot County, Kenya. The dam serves several purposes, including hydroelectric power production, irrigation, tourism and fisheries. It was constructed between 1986 and 1991. It supports the third largest hydroelectric power plant in the country, with an installed generating capacity of 112 MW.

The dam, Kenya's tallest, has a height of 153 metres (502 ft), a crest length of 150 m, a dam volume of 170,000 cubic metres (6,000,000 cu ft) and retains a water volume of 1,641 million cubic metres (1,330,000 acre⋅ft). The power station is located underground, downstream, and contains two 56 MW Francis turbine generators. The difference in elevation between the reservoir and power station affords a net hydraulic head of 356 m (1,168 ft).

== See also ==
- List of power stations in Kenya
- List of hydropower stations in Africa
