= List of power stations in Kenya =

Power stations in Kenya

The following page lists power stations in Kenya.

== Geothermal ==
Station	Location	Capacity (MW)	Notes
Olkaria I Geothermal Power Station	0°53′35″S 36°18′32″E	268.3	
Olkaria II Geothermal Power Station	0°51′51″S 36°17′58″E	105	
Olkaria III Geothermal Power Station	0°53′20″S 36°15′19″E	139	
Olkaria IV Geothermal Power Station	0°55′05″S 36°20′04″E	140	
Olkaria V Geothermal Power Station	0°53′59″S 36°21′02″E	158	
Akiira One Geothermal Power Station	00°56′00″S 36°18′00″E	70	Planned
Menengai I Geothermal Power Station	00°11′35″S 36°04′12″E	35	In development
Menengai II Geothermal Power Station	00°11′46″S 36°03′47″E	35	In development
Menengai III Geothermal Power Station	00°11′43″S 36°04′54″E	35	In development

== Hydroelectric ==
Station	Location	Type	Capacity (MW)	Commissioned
Gitaru Hydroelectric Power Station	00°47′43″S 37°45′09″E	Reservoir	225	1999
Kiambere Power Station		Reservoir	165	1988
Kindaruma Hydroelectric Power Station	00°48′38″S 37°48′46″E	Reservoir	72	1968
Masinga Hydroelectric Power Station	00°53′21″S 37°35′40″E	Reservoir	40	1981
Gogo Power Station		Reservoir	2.0	1957
Kamburu Hydroelectric Power Station	00°48′21″S 37°41′08″E	Reservoir	93	1974
Mesco Power Station		Reservoir	0.4	1930
Ndula Hydroelectric Power Station	01°01′35″S 37°14′36″E	Reservoir	2.0	1924
Sagana Power Station		Reservoir	1.5	1956
Sang'oro Hydroelectric Power Station	00°21′13″S 34°48′48″E	Run of river	21.2	2013
Sondu Miriu Hydroelectric Power Station	00°20′33″S 34°51′08″E	Run of river	60	2007
Tana Hydroelectric Power Station	00°47′08″S 37°15′55″E	Reservoir	20	2010
Turkwel Hydroelectric Power Station	01°55′00″N 35°20′30″E	Reservoir	106	1991
Wanjii Hydroelectric Power Station	00°44′58″S 37°10′29″E	Reservoir	7.4	1952
Sosiani Power Station		Reservoir	0.4	1955

== Fossil fuels: oil, coal, and gas ==
Station	Location	Type	Capacity (MW)	Commissioned
Kipevu I Thermal Power Station	4°2′S 39°38′E	Heavy fuel oil	63	1999
Tsavo Thermal Power Station	4°2′S 39°38′E	Heavy fuel oil	75	2001
Nairobi South Thermal Power Station	1°17′S 36°49′E	Heavy fuel oil	109	1997
Gulf Energy Thermal Power Station	01°27′30″S 37°00′14″E	Heavy fuel oil	80	2014
Lamu Coal Power Station	2°17′S 40°51′E	Coal	960	Cancelled
Biojoule Thermal Power Station	0°51′S 36°22′E	Biogas	2.6	2015
Baringo Thermal Power Station	0°31′S 35°45′E	Biogas	10.8	2015
Thika Thermal Power Station	03°56′S 39°40′E	Heavy fuel oil	87	2012
Rabai Thermal Power Station	03°56′S 39°40′E	Heavy fuel oil	90	2009
Dongo Kundu Thermal Power Station	04°04′S 39°37′E	Liquefied natural gas	700	Cancelled 2016

== Wind ==
Station	Location	Capacity (MW)	Commissioned	Notes
Ngong Hills Wind Power Station	01°22′52″N 36°38′08″E	25.5	1993	
Lake Turkana Wind Power Station	02°43′33″N 36°48′06″E	310	2018	
Kipeto Wind Power Station	01°43′09″S 36°41′40″E	100	January 2021	Operational
Meru Wind Power Station	00°19′47″N 37°35′30″E	400	2017 (expected)	Planned
Lamu Wind Power Station	02°24′59″S 40°44′32″E	90	2020 (expected)	Planned

== Solar ==
Solar power station	Community	Coordinates	Capacity (megawatts)	Year completed	Owner	Notes
Garissa Solar Power Station	Garissa County	00°18′58″S 39°41′53″E	55	2017	Kenya Rural Electrification Authority	
Alten Solar Power Station	Uasin Gishu County	00°24′47″N 35°24′04″E	55	2023	Alten Energías Renovables	
Radiant Solar Power Station	Uasin Gishu County	00°25′32″N 35°21′40″E	40	2021	Radiant Energy	
Eldosol Solar Power Station	Uasin Gishu County	00°25′32″N 35°21′37″E	40	2021	Eldosol Solar Consortium	
Kopere Solar Power Station	Nandi County	00°00′02″S 35°11′50″E	50	2021 (expected)	Voltalia Portugal SA	
Malindi Solar Power Station	Kilifi County	03°12′25″S 39°44′49″E	52	2022	Malindi Solar Group Limited	
KenGen Floating Solar Power Station	Machakos County	00°48′27″S 37°41′06″E	42.5	2026 (expected)	KenGen	

== See also ==
- Energy in Kenya
- List of largest power stations in the world
- List of power stations in Africa
