= Lamu–Garissa–Isiolo Road =

Road in Kenya

Coordinates: 00°22′14″S 39°42′37″E

B Road
- Lamu Port–Garissa–Isiolo

Route information
- Length: 580 km (360 mi)

Major junctions
- Southeast end: Lamu Port
- Garissa
- Northwest end: Isiolo

Location
- Country: Kenya
- Counties: Lamu County, Tana River County, Garissa County, Isiolo County, Meru County
- Major cities: Lamu, Garissa, Mado Gashi, Isiolo

Highway system
- Transport in Kenya

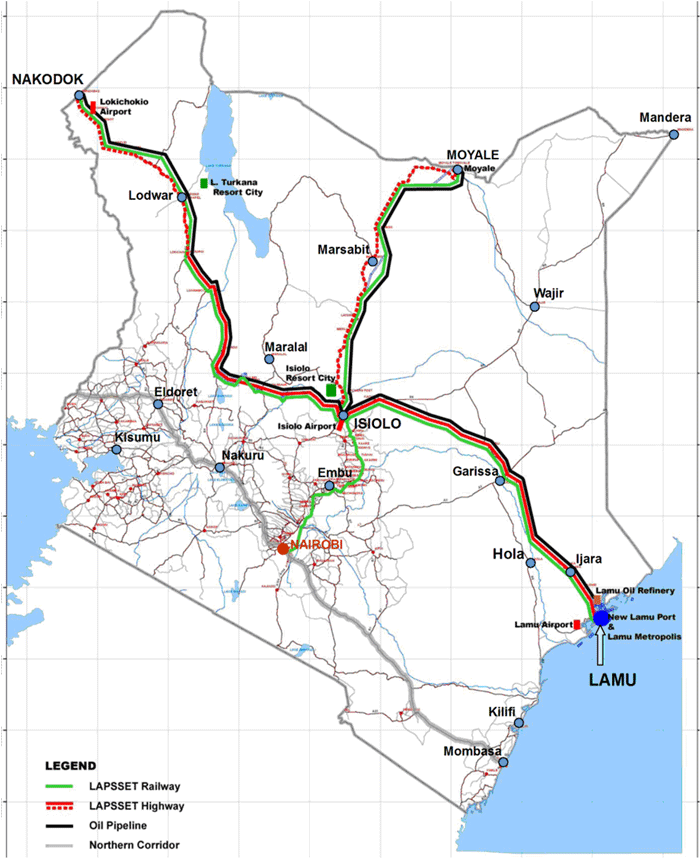
Map showing the scope of the LAPSSET Project within Kenya

Lamu–Garissa–Isiolo Road, is a road in Kenya, and is part of the Lamu-Garissa-Isiolo-Lokichar Road, which itself is a component of the Lamu Port and Lamu-Southern Sudan-Ethiopia Transport Corridor (LAPSSET) Project.

== Location ==
The road starts in the port city of Lamu and proceeds in a northwesterly direction through the town of Bura, Tana River County, (not to be confused with Bura, Garissa County) and continue on to the town of Garissa. At Garissa, the road continues its northwesterly direction to Mado Gashi. Here it takes a southwesterly direction through Garba Tula, to end at Isiolo, a total distance of approximately 580 kilometres (360 mi). The approximate coordinates of the road, immediately north of the town of Garissa are:0°22'14.0"S, 39°42'37.0"E (Latitude:-0.370556; Longitude: 39.710278).

== Overview ==
This road is part of Lapsset corridor highway project. At Isiolo, this road links with the Isiolo-Lokichar Road, which is also planned. The road the joins with the existing Eldoret-Juba Highway, which will lead to the border with South Sudan. Also at Isiolo the Lamu–Garissa–Isiolo Road will connect with the planned Isiolo-Moyale Road leading to the border with Ethiopia at Moyale.

In October 2016, a consortium of lenders, led by the Development Bank of South Africa agreed to lend the estimated Kenya Sh:71 billion (about US$700 million), needed to construct this road.

== Urban centres ==
The following urban centres lie along the route of the planned Lamu–Garissa–Isiolo Road: (1) Lamu Port (2) Bura, Garrisa, Kachiuru and Ndumuru in Meru County, Mado Gashi, El Dera, Gaba Tula and Isiolo.

== Intersections ==
These are the major intersections along this road: (1) The Mombasa–Garissa Road at Garissa (2) The Thika–Liboi Road at Garissa (3) The Garissa–Nuno–Modogashe–Wajir Road at Garissa (4) The Isiolo-Mandera Road at Mado Gashi.

Intersections with planned roads include: (1) The Isiolo-Lokichar Road at Isiolo and (2) The Isiolo-Moyale Road also at Isiolo.

== See also ==
- Trans-African Highway network
- List of roads in Kenya
