= Mombasa–Garissa Road =

Road in Kenya

Coordinates: 02°16′13″S 40°04′24″E

B8 Road
- Mombasa–Malindi–Garissa Road

Route information
- Length: 288 mi (463 km)

Major junctions
- Beltway around Kilifi; Malindi; Garsen; Bura
- South end: Mombasa
- North end: Garissa

Location
- Country: Kenya
- Counties: Mombasa County, Kilifi County, Tana River County, Garissa County

Highway system
- Transport in Kenya

The Mombasa–Garissa Road, also B8 Road (Kenya) is a major highway in Kenya, the largest economy in the East African Community. The road connects the port city of Mombasa to the inland city of Garissa. This road is composed of the Mombasa–Malindi Road and the Malindi–Garissa Road.

== Location ==
The road starts in the city of Mombasa and takes a general northerly direction through Kilifi, Malindi, Garsen and Bura, to end at Garissa, a distance of approximately 463 kilometres (288 mi). The coordinates of this road west of the town of Garsen, Tana River County, are: 02°16'13.0"S, 40°04'24.0"E (Latitude:-2.270284; Longitude:40.073323).

== Overview ==
The road employs a single-carriageway system that is subject to the country's national speed limit of 80 kilometres per hour (50 mph). In 2006, the Kenyan Government budgeted KSh.2 billion/= (almost £16 million stg. in 2008) to resurface the 116 kilometres (72 mi) section between Mombasa and Malindi, through Kilifi.

The Garsen to Garissa section of this road, measuring about 241 kilometres (150 mi), remains in poor condition, marked by potholes and a dusty surface.

== Major road connections ==
In Mombasa, the Mombasa–Garissa Road connects to two other major roads: (a) the Nairobi–Mombasa Road (A109) and (b) the Malindi–Bagamoyo Highway (A14), north-eastern Tanzania. In Garissa, this road meets the Thika–Liboi Road, connecting Thika, in Kiambu County to Liboi in Garissa County, at the border with Somalia.

== Towns ==
The following towns, listed from south to north, are located along the highway:

- Mombasa
- Mtwapa
- Kilifi
- Malindi
- Mambrui
- Gongoni
- Garsen
- Hola
- Bura
- Garissa
