= Garissa–Nuno–Modogashe–Wajir Road =

Road in Kenya

Coordinates: 01°08′59″N 39°40′05″E

Route information
- Length: 199 mi (320 km)
- History: Designated in 2015; Completion in 2017 (Expected)

Major junctions
- South end: Garissa
- Nuno; Modogashe
- North end: Wajir

Location
- Country: Kenya

Highway system
- Transport in Kenya

The Garissa–Nuno–Modogashe–Wajir Road is a road in Kenya, connecting the towns of Garissa, Nuno, Modogashe and Wajir.

== Location ==
The road starts at Garissa, Garissa County, on the Nairobi–Thika–Garissa–Dadaab–Liboi Road. It travels north-eastwards for about 12 kilometres (7 mi) to the settlement of Modikarey. From there, it makes a left turn and heads north to Modogashe, in Garissa County, a distance of approximately 150 kilometres (93 mi). At Modogashe, it turns north-eastwards and goes for another 158 kilometres (98 mi) to Wajir where it ends, a total road distance of 320 kilometres (199 mi).

== Overview ==
This road, is an important trade corridor for traffic headed from Nairobi to Ethiopia via Moyale or Rhamu. Together with the proposed Garsen–Witu–Lamu Highway, is a component of the Lamu-Moyale Highway, part of LAPSSET.

== Upgrade and funding ==
The government of Kenya upgraded the first 20 kilometres (12 mi) of this road, using locally sourced funds. The government then approached the oil-rich Arab countries for loans to upgrade the 145 kilometres (90 mi) Nuno–Modogashe section at an estimated cost Sh13.4 billion (approx. US$134.5 million). In March 2013, government received loans and grants from (a) the Kuwait Fund (b) the OPEC Fund (c) the Saudi Fund (d) the Abu Dhabi Fund and the Arab Bank for Economic Development in Africa, to fund the upgrade of the Nuno–Modogashe Road.

The construction work was contracted to Arab Contractors Limited of Egypt. Work was expected to start in 2015 and conclude in 2017.

== See also ==
- List of roads in Kenya
- LAPSSET
