= Kibwezi–Kitui–Kandwia–Usueni Road =

Road in Kenya

Coordinates: 01°22′23″S 38°00′42″E

B7 Road
- Kibwezi–Kitui–Kandwia–Usueni Road

Route information
- Length: 261 mi (420 km)

Major junctions
- South end: Kibwezi
- Mutomo; Ikanga; Kitui; Mwingi
- North end: Usueni

Location
- Country: Kenya
- Counties: Makueni County, Machakos County, Kitui County

Highway system
- Transport in Kenya

The Kibwezi–Kitui–Kandwia–Usueni Road, also B7 Road (Kenya) is a road in Kenya, the largest economy in the East African Community. The road connects the town of Kibwezi in Makueni County to the community of Usueni in Kitui County. Since its upgrading, the road has opened up many villages and rural-urban settings to business and agricultural activities.

== Location ==
Starting in the city of Kibwezi on the Nairobi–Mombasa Road, the road takes a general northerly direction through Mutomo, Ikanga, Kitui, and Mwingi to end at Usueni, a distance of approximately 317 kilometres (197 mi) Later, with the addition of ring roads and bypasses around the larger urban areas, the total road distance has increased to 420 kilometres (261 mi). The coordinates of this road in the town of Kitui are 01°22'23.0"S, 38°00'42.0"E (Latitude:-1.373056; Longitude:38.011667).

== Overview ==
This road connects the relatively remote parts of the counties of Kitui, Machakos, and Makueni to the Nairobi–Mombasa Road (A109) and the Thika–Liboi (A3) road, both major highways. These links increase access to both Nairobi and Mombasa for these remote communities.

== Upgrading to tarmac ==
The road, being a Class B road, is under the supervision and management of the Kenya National Highways Authority. It is being upgraded to Class II bitumen surface, with shoulders, culverts, and drainage channels. The construction contract was awarded to Sinohydro Corporation of China, with joint funding from the China Export Import Bank and the government of Kenya. Construction began on 6 December 2016, with completion expected in December 2019.

== Towns ==
The following seventeen towns, listed from south towards north, are located along this road: 1. Kibwezi 2. Athi River 3. Ikutha 4. Mutomo 5. Ikanga 6. Mwewe 7. Kitui 8. Katheka 9. Kwa Siku 10. Migwani 11. Thokoa 12. Musuani 13. Mbondoni 14. Mwingi 15. Waita 16. Kamuwongo 17. Katse 18. Usueni. The new road has been attributed to land appreciation, particularly in Kitui and Mutomo town which are now becoming business hubs for outsiders targeting the route for its connection to Mombasa. Currently, an estimated 5000sqm of land plots along the Kitui-Kibwezi roads are fetching approximately kes. 450,000 post-road construction. Five years ago, land prices in Mutomo ranged between kes 70,000 - 95,000.
