= Witu, Kenya =

Witu
- Town
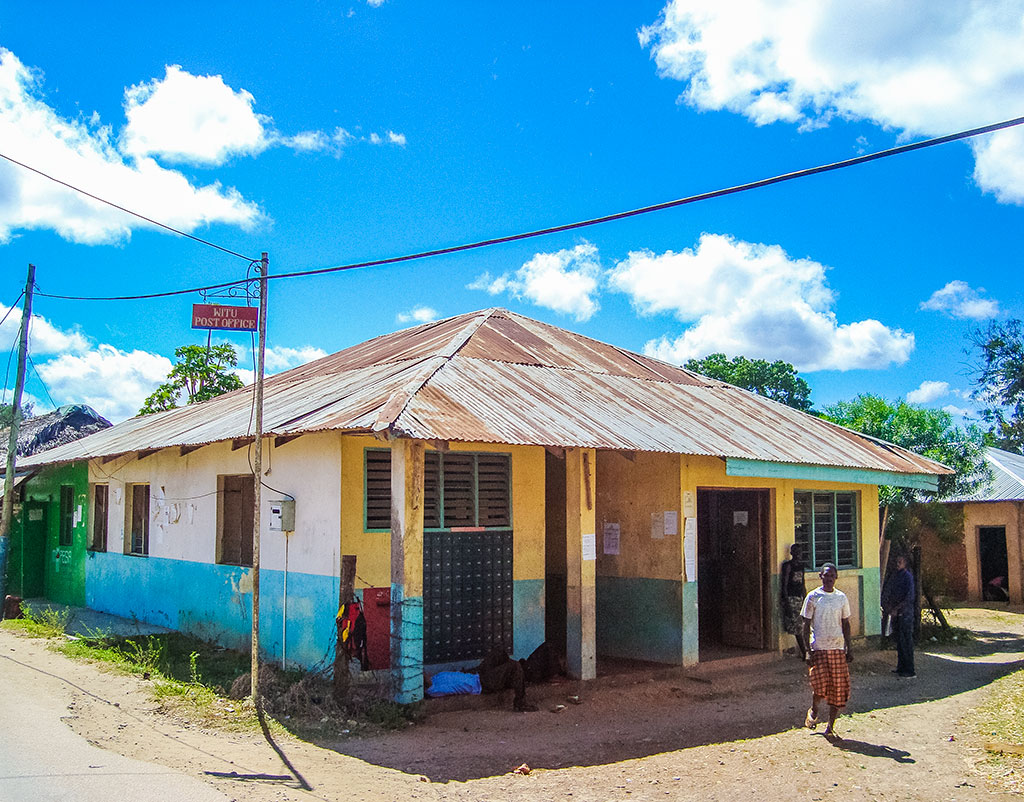
- The Post Office at Witu, on the way to Lamu

- Location within Kenya Location within the Horn of Africa Location within Africa
- Coordinates: 02°23′20″S 40°26′16″E
- Country: Kenya
- Counties: Lamu County
- Elevation: 22 m (72 ft)

Population (2013 Estimate)
  - Total: 5,380
- Time zone: UTC+3 (EAT)

Witu is a small market town in the Lamu County of Kenya, East Africa. Formerly it was the capital of Wituland.

== Location ==
It is 5 kilometres (3.1 mi) west of the Witu Forest. It is on the Garsen–Witu–Lamu Highway (C-112) between Mkunumbi, 33 kilometres (20.5 mi) to the east, and Garsen, 44 kilometres (27.3 mi) to the west. A secondary road leads 21 kilometres (13.0 mi) south to Kipini on the coast. The coordinates of Witu, Kenya are: 2°23'20.0"S, 40°26'16.0"E (Latitude:-2.388897; Longitude:40.437769). The average elevation of the town is about 22 metres (72 ft).

== Population ==
As of September 2013, the population of the town was estimated at 5,380.

== Wituland ==
Witu was the centre of an inland empire of approximately 3,000 square kilometres (1,200 mi^{2}). It was inhabited by slaves fleeing the Zanzibar slave trade, and was thus a target of attacks from the Sultanate of Zanzibar, circa 1850.

== See also ==
- List of roads in Kenya
- Historic Swahili Settlements
- Swahili architecture
