= Garsen–Witu–Lamu Highway =

Road in Kenya

Coordinates: 02°23′19″S 40°30′36″E

Route information
- Length: 84 mi (135 km)
- History: Designated in 2016; Completion in 2021 (Expected)

Major junctions
- West end: Garsen
- Witu
- East end: Lamu

Location
- Country: Kenya

Highway system
- Transport in Kenya

Garsen–Witu–Lamu Highway is a road, under construction in Kenya, connecting the towns of Garsen, Witu and Lamu.

== Location ==
The road starts at Garsen, in Tana River County, pursuing a general easterly direction through Witu to end at Mokowe in Lamu County, where the ferry connects to Lamu Island, a total distance of about 122 kilometres (76 mi). However the construction contract gives the distance as 135 kilometres (84 mi).

== Overview ==
This road, is an important trade corridor for traffic headed from Nairobi, South Sudan and Ethiopia, to the proposed Port Lamu and is a component of the Lamu-Moyale Highway, part of LAPSSET.

== Upgrade and funding ==
The government of Kenya, using locally sourced funds, plans to upgrade the entire road to class II bitumen surface with shoulders, culverts and drainage channels. Kenya National Highway Authority is handling the hiring of a qualified, competent contractor to carry on the work.

H-Young Company was selected to improve the surface to grade II bitumen standard, widen the road to 7 metres (23 ft) across, with culverts, drainage channels and side paths at a cost of KSh10.8 billion (US$108 million). As of December 2018, construction works were approximately 20 percent complete, with a completion date of December 2019.

In December 2020 The EastAfrican newspaper reported construction progress at 75 percent, with commissioning expected in October 2021.

In March 2021, The Star Kenya reported work progress at an estimated 87 percent complete. At that time the road length is reported as 114 kilometres (71 mi) long. Completion is expected later in 2021.

== See also ==
- List of roads in Kenya
- LAPSSET
- B8 road (Kenya)
