= Kisumu–Kakamega–Webuye–Kitale Road =

Road in Kenya

Coordinates: 00°15′08″N 34°45′01″E

Route information
- Length: 99 mi (159 km)
- History: Designated in 2015; Completed in 2017 (Expected)

Major junctions
- South end: Kisumu
- Kakamega; Webuye
- North end: Kitale

Location
- Country: Kenya

Highway system
- Transport in Kenya

The Kisumu–Kakamega–Webuye–Kitale Road, is a rural road in Kenya. The road links Kisumu, in Kisumu County, to the towns of Kakamega, in Kakamega County, Webuye in Bungoma County, and Kitale in Trans-Nzoia County.

== Location ==
The road starts at Kisumu, on the northeastern shores of Lake Victoria. It takes a general northerly direction through Kakamega and Webuye, to end at Kitale, on the Suam–Endebess–Kitale–Eldoret Road, a total distance of about 160 kilometres (99 mi). The coordinates of the road, south of Kakamega are:0°15'08.0"N, 34°45'01.0"E (Latitude:0°15'08.0"N; Longitude:34°45'01.0"E).

== Overview ==
This road is part of an important road corridor that links the four counties that it passes through, to markets in Uganda and South Sudan. The road also connects to Tanzania via the Isebania–Kisii–Ahero Road. The road is divided into three sections, namely (a) Kisumu–Kakamega (b) Kakamega–Webuye and (c) Webuye–Kitale. The road is designated as a Class A road, and is under the jurisdiction of Kenya National Highway Authority.

== Upgrading and widening ==
Beginning in 2015, the Government of Kenya, through its parastatal KeNHA began to widen the road to 11 meters (36 feet), with shoulders, culverts, drainage channels, passing lanes, bus stops and access roads in urban centres. In some sections the road was widened to dual carriage. The entire project was budgeted at KSh4.7 billion (approximately US$46.7 million). The project was completed in 2017. *Note: US$1.00 = KSh100.80 on 4 April 2016

== See also ==
- List of roads in Kenya
- East African Community
