= Liboi Airport =

- IATA: LBK; ICAO: n/a

Summary
- Airport type: Public
- Owner/Operator: Kenya Civil Aviation Authority
- Serves: Liboi
- Elevation AMSL: 320 ft / 98 m
- Coordinates: 00°21′14″N 40°52′40″E

Map
- Location of the airport in Kenya

Runways
| Direction | Length | | Surface |
| Direction | m | ft | Surface |
|---|---|---|---|
| 12/30 | 1,800 | 6,000 | Murram |

Liboi Airport (IATA: LBK, ICAO: n/a) is an airport serving the town of Liboi in the Garissa County of Kenya.

== Location ==
The airport lies adjacent to and is southeast of the town of Liboi. It is approximately 556 kilometres (345 mi) by road, and 478 kilometres (297 mi) by air, north-east of Jomo Kenyatta International Airport, the largest airport in Kenya. The coordinates of this airport are 0°21'14.0"N, 40°52'40.0"E (Latitude:0.353889; Longitude:40.877778).

== Overview ==
The airport is at an average elevation of 320 feet (98 m) and has a single murram-surfaced runway (12/30), measuring 6,000 feet (1,800 m) long.

== See also ==
- List of airports in Kenya
- Transport in Kenya
