= A3 road (Kenya) =

Road in Kenya

A3 Road
- A3 highlighted in red

Route information
- Maintained by KeNHA
- Length: 507 km (315 mi)

Major junctions
- West end: Thika
- East end: Liboi

Location
- Country: Kenya

Highway system
- Transport in Kenya

The A3 road is a long road in Kenya extending from Thika to the Somali border.

The road is paved all the way to Modika, where it then is unpaved for the remainder of the way to the Somali border.

== Towns ==
The following towns, listed from west to east, are located along the highway.

- Thika (intersection with A2 road)
- Mwingi
- Garissa
- Dadaab
- Liboi (the last town before the Somalian border)
