= Malindi Kingdom =

Bantu civilization in eastern Africa

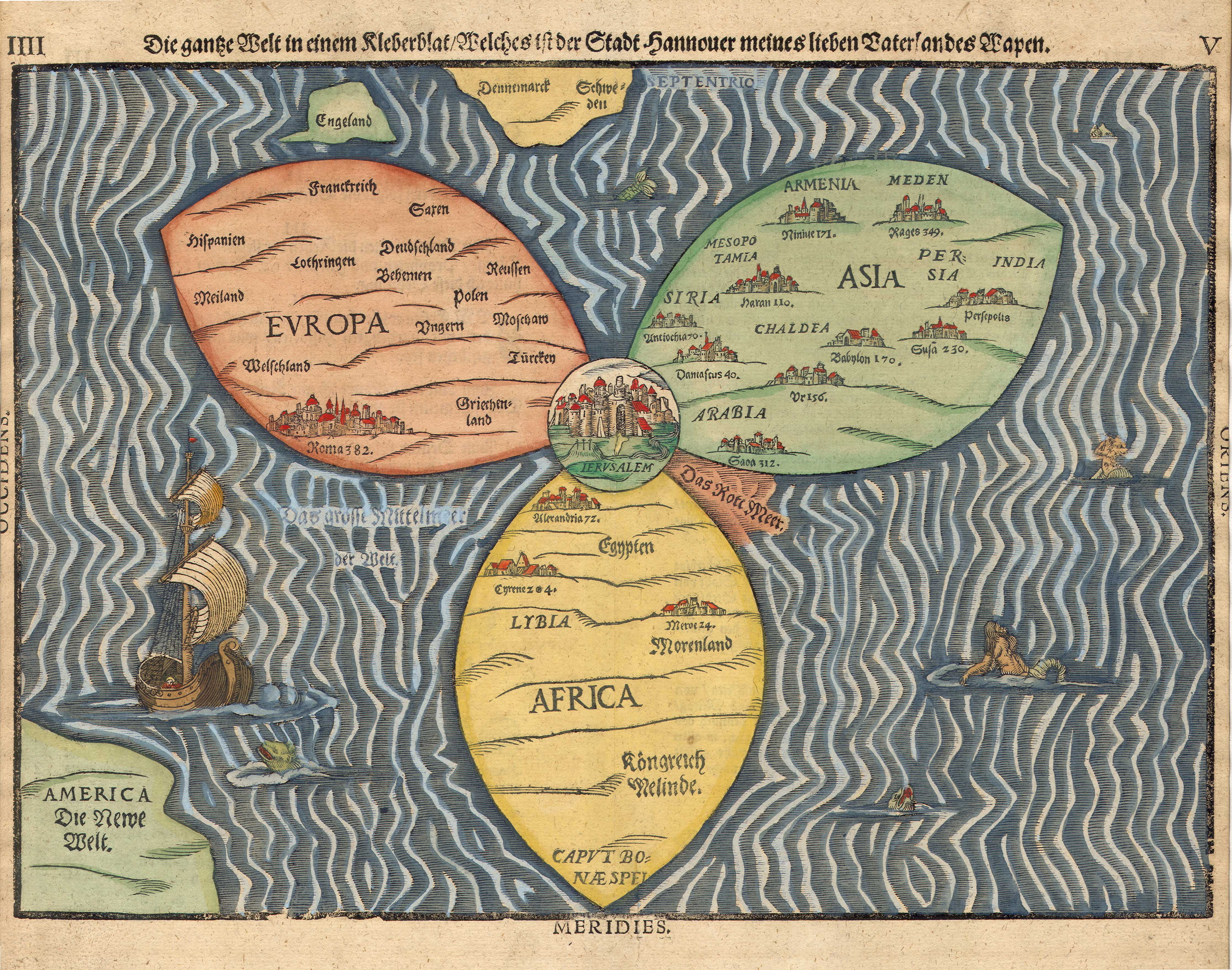
World map from 1581, showing kingdom "Melinde" in Africa

The Malindi Kingdom was a Bantu civilization on the eastern coast of Africa, specifically the modern Kenya, from approximately the 9th through 15th centuries. History reveals their noteworthy cultural and trade crossroads between the Bantu and Arab peoples, and also trades with Ming China, India, and Portugal. Pottery products from all three regions have been found there dating to between the 13th and 15th centuries.

Traces of pottery originating from the Ming dynasty have led to speculations that the Chinese diplomat and explorer Zheng He might have visited the town in the early 15th century. A team of archaeologists financed by the Chinese government spent several years excavating a site near Mambrui without finding any conclusive evidence supporting the theory.

== History ==
The Old Town Malindi may have been located somewhere north of the modern city. There is a debate about the exact location of the kingdom, if it was centered initially around Old Town Malindi, or Mambrui. The general settlement of this region seems to date back to about 850 AD. Old town Malindi seems to have been destroyed around 1000 AD, but resettlements were made by 1250.

There were also Chinese texts dated as early as the 9th century indicating names of far-western ports that seem to be phonetically similar to Malindi. But it is still uncertain if they actually refer to the African kingdom, centuries before the Zheng He voyages. Around that time, the Ajuran Empire north of Malindi appear to have been trading with China, as coins from as early as the Song dynasty have been recovered at appropriate levels in modern Somalia.

The kingdom appears to have thrived from 1250 through the appearance of Vasco de Gama in the 15th century, when colonization of the region seems to have caused a decline.
