= List of international presidential trips made by Yoweri Museveni =

Yoweri Museveni has made numerous international trips to various countries as the President of Uganda since taking office on 26 January 1986.

== Summary ==
A selection of official international travel destinations visited by Yoweri Museveni includes:

- One visit: Algeria, Belarus, Brazil, Democratic Republic of the Congo, Iceland, Indonesia, Israel, Italy, Libya, Malaysia, New Zealand, Qatar, Rwanda, Saudi Arabia, South Korea, Sri Lanka, Thailand, Togo, Trinidad and Tobago, Vietnam, and Zimbabwe.
- Two visits: Cuba, Egypt, Ethiopia, Japan, Senegal, South Africa, South Sudan, and Sudan.
- Three visits: China, India, Iran, North Korea, Russia, United Arab Emirates, and United Kingdom.
- Four visits: France.
- Five or more visits: Kenya (5 visits), Tanzania (7 visits), and United States (10 visits).

== 1980s ==
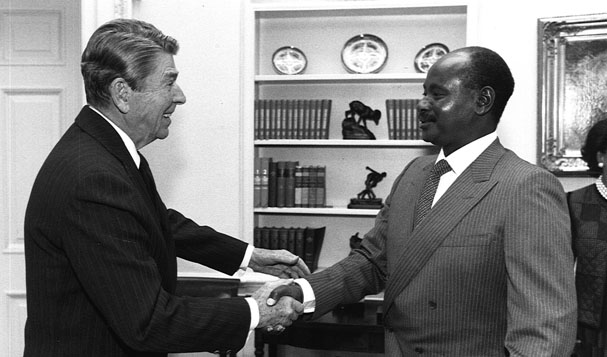
Museveni's meeting with President Ronald Reagan at the White House in October 1987

#	Country	Areas visited	Dates	Details
1	North Korea	Pyongyang	1987	Official visit. Met with Supreme Leader Kim Il Sung to establish bilateral diplomatic and military training ties.
2	United States	Washington, D.C.	19 October 1987	Private visit. Met with President Ronald Reagan at the White House.
3	Cuba	Havana	9 January 1988	First official trip to Havana. Met with Cuban leader Fidel Castro to build early diplomatic, medical, and educational relations.

== 1990s ==
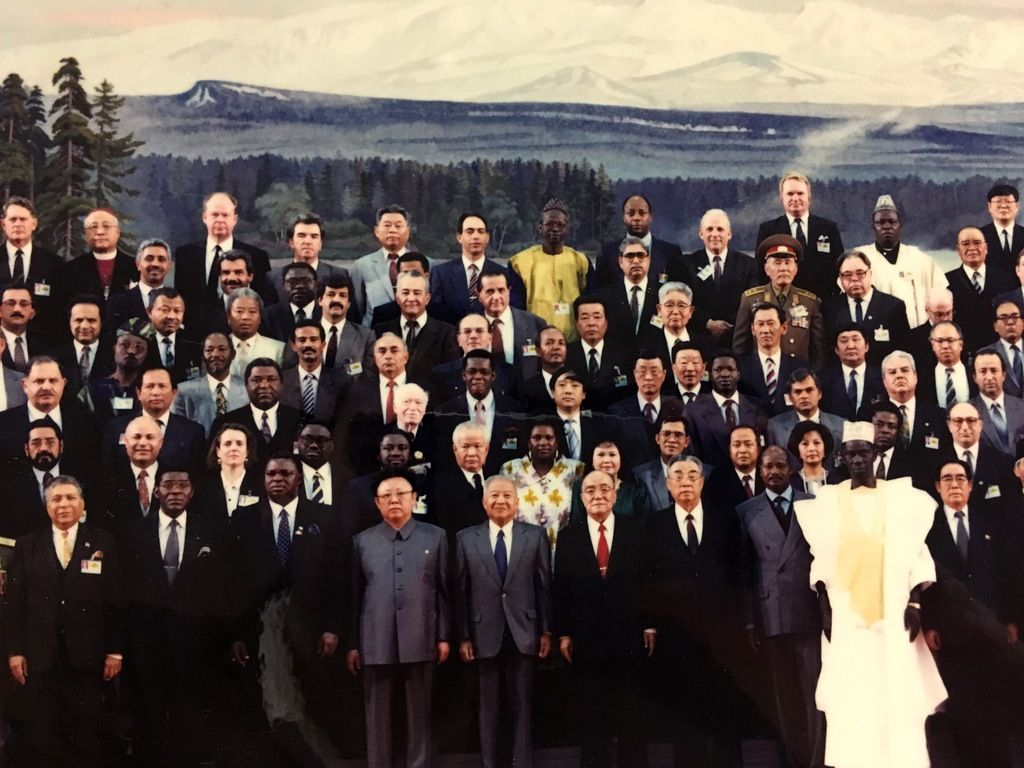
Museveni (first row, third from right) at Kim Il Sung's 80th birthday celebration in 1992

#	Country	Areas visited	Dates	Details
4	North Korea	Pyongyang	1990	Official visit. Held discussions with Kim Il Sung regarding security assistance and equipment procurement.
5	France	Paris	3 September 1990	Bilateral visit. Met with French President François Mitterrand at the Élysée Palace.
6	United States	New York City	1 October 1990	Met with President George H. W. Bush at the United Nations General Assembly.
7	France	Strasbourg	12 March 1991	Addressed the European Parliament.
8	North Korea	Pyongyang	12–16 April 1992	Official visit. Met with Kim Il Sung during his final years of leadership to review defense cooperation and to celebrate his 80th birthday.
9	India	New Delhi	12–15 October 1992	First official state visit to India. Met with President Ramaswamy Venkataraman and Prime Minister P. V. Narasimha Rao to strengthen trade ties.
10	Indonesia	Jakarta	7–8 October 1993	Two-day official visit as part of an East Asian tour. Met with President Suharto at the Merdeka Palace.
11	United States	Washington, D.C.	18–22 June 1994	Private visit. Met with President Bill Clinton.
12	Rwanda	Kigali	15 August 1995	Official state visit following the end of the Rwandan Genocide. Delivered an address on sovereignty and non-intervention in Kigali.
13	France	Paris	3–5 February 1997	State visit. Met with President Jacques Chirac to discuss Great Lakes regional security.
14	Democratic Republic of the Congo	Kinshasa	13–14 August 1997	Official visit following the First Congo War. Held regional security talks with President Laurent-Désiré Kabila.
15	Senegal	Dakar	13–15 November 1997	Official visit. Co-chaired the 4th biennial seminar on education with President Abdou Diouf.
16	Malaysia	Kuala Lumpur	14–16 April 1998	Three-day official state visit to discuss bilateral economic and South–South cooperation.

== 2000s ==
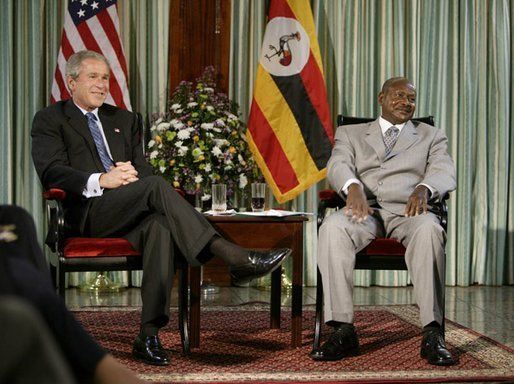
Museveni and US President George W. Bush in June 2003

#	Country	Areas visited	Dates	Details
17	Belarus	Minsk	Late March to 2 April 2000	Official state visit. Met with President Alexander Lukashenko to establish diplomatic ties and trade cooperation.
18	Iran	Tehran	15–18 May 2001	State visit. Held talks with President Mohammad Khatami to enhance economic cooperation.
19	United States	Washington, D.C.	5–7 May 2002	Working visit. Met with President George W. Bush.
20	Israel	Jerusalem, Golan Heights	13–18 January 2003	Six-day official visit. Met with President Moshe Katsav, Prime Minister Ariel Sharon, and Foreign Minister Benjamin Netanyahu, and toured defense facilities and holy sites.
21	United States	Washington, D.C., Sea Island	9–14 June 2003	Working visit. Held discussions regarding PEPFAR and bilateral HIV/AIDS initiatives. Also attended the 30th G8 Summit upon invitation by President George W. Bush.
22	Libya	Tripoli	20-21 May 2004	Official visit. Met with Libyan leader Muammar Gaddafi and presented him with Uganda's highest military decoration, the Order of Katonga, in recognition of his support for the National Resistance Army during the Ugandan Bush War.
23	New Zealand	Auckland, Wellington	26–29 March 2007	Official visit. Addressed the Commonwealth Local Government Conference and participated in traditional Māori cultural receptions.
24	Tanzania	Bukoba, Mwanza	10–11 July 2007	Official road visit to northern Tanzania. Met with local citizens and paid homage to former President Julius Nyerere.
25	Trinidad and Tobago	Port of Spain	29 July – 2 August 2007	Five-day official visit. Met with local leaders and spoke as special guest at the Emancipation Day celebrations in Port of Spain.
26	United States	Washington, D.C.	29–31 October 2007	Working visit. Held discussions with U.S. government officials.
27	India	New Delhi	7–11 April 2008	State visit. Attended the inaugural India–Africa Forum Summit and met with Prime Minister Manmohan Singh.
28	Iceland	Reykjavík	17–18 September 2008	Official visit accompanied by First Lady Janet Museveni. Held talks on geothermal energy development and fisheries.
29	United States	New York City	23 September 2008	Met with President George W. Bush during the UN General Assembly.
30	Iran	Tehran	16–18 May 2009	Working visit. Held bilateral talks with President Mahmoud Ahmadinejad regarding oil refinery investments.
31	Cuba	Havana	13–16 December 2009	Four-day state visit accompanied by First Lady Janet Museveni. Met with President Raúl Castro, laid a wreath at the José Martí Memorial, and toured educational and pharmaceutical facilities.

== 2010s ==
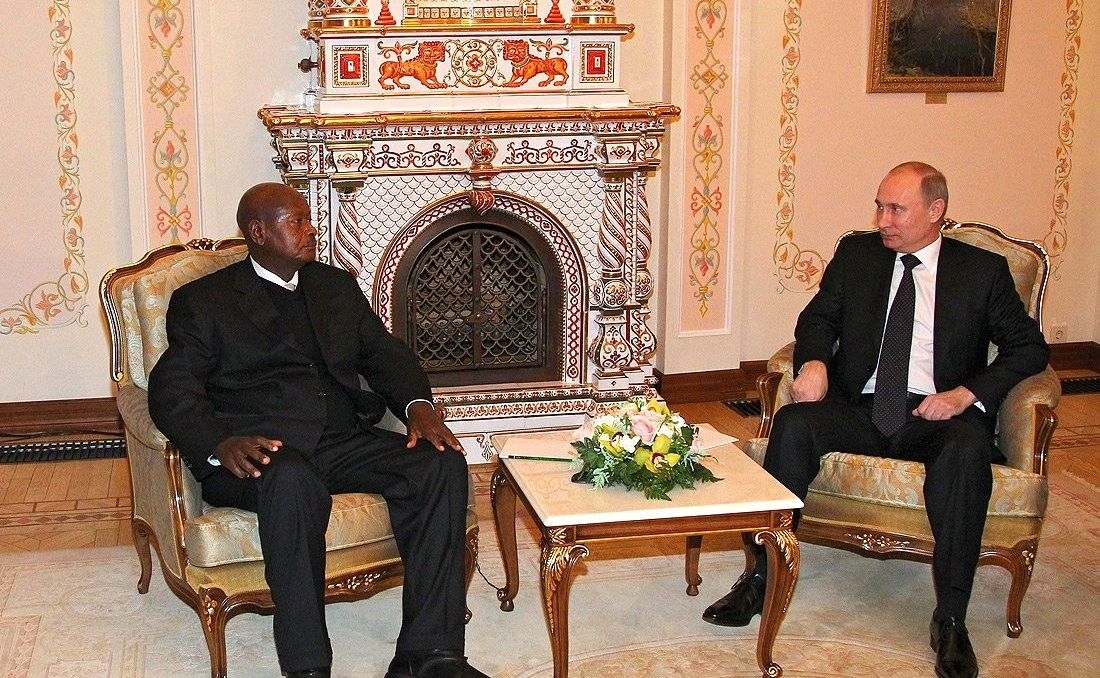
Vladimir Putin and Museveni in 2012

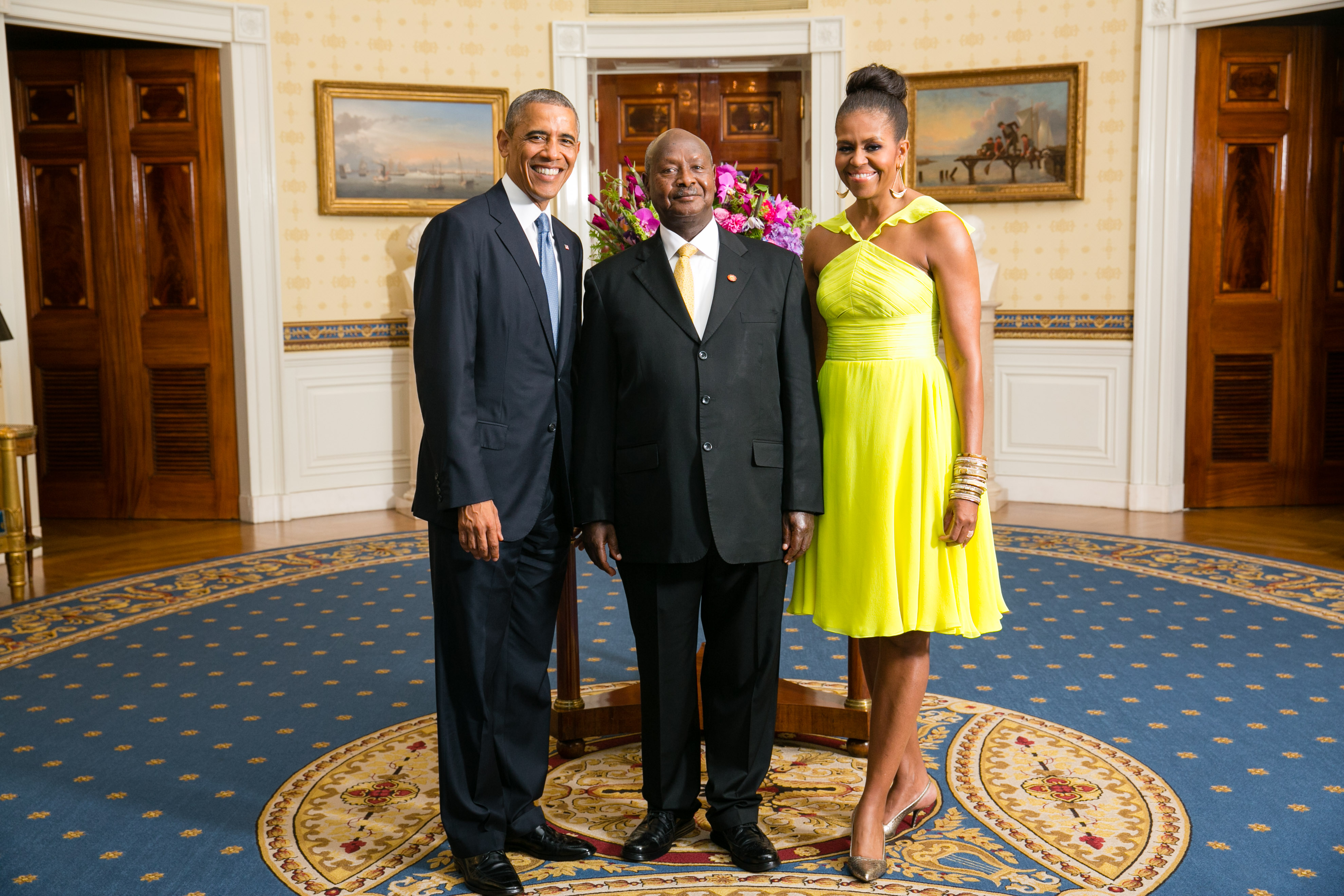
Museveni is greeted by US President Barack Obama in August 2014.

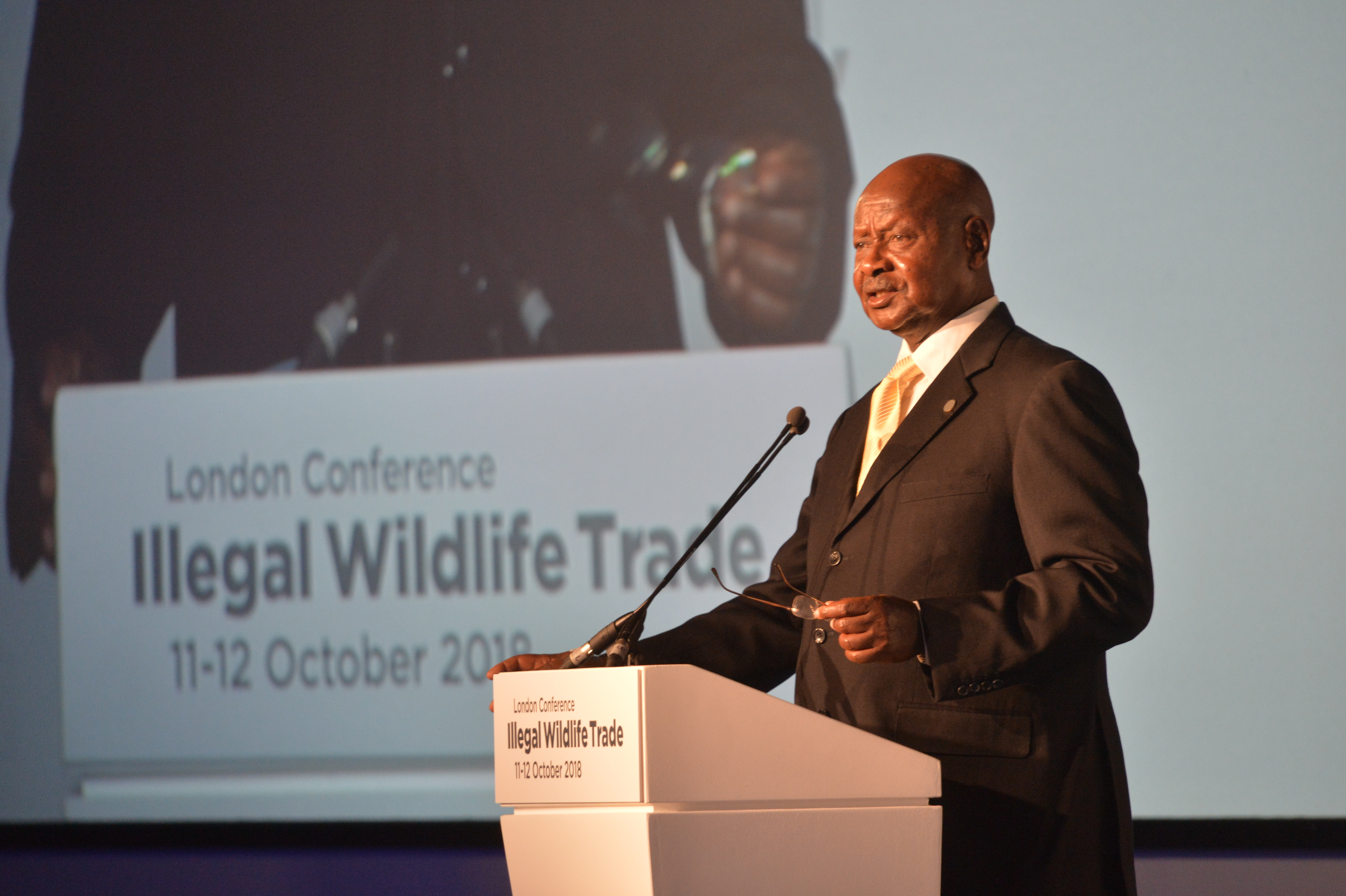
Museveni speaking at the Illegal Wildlife Trade Conference in London, October 2018

#	Country	Areas visited	Dates	Details
31	Brazil	Rio de Janeiro	22–26 March 2010	Attended the 5th World Urban Forum organized by UN-Habitat. Delivered a keynote address on urban development and infrastructure, and held bilateral talks with President Luiz Inácio Lula da Silva.
32	South Africa	Pretoria, KwaZulu-Natal	20–22 January 2011	State visit. Met with President Jacob Zuma to hold bilateral discussions on economic cooperation and infrastructure.
33	Iran	Tehran	29–31 August 2012	Attended the 16th Summit of the Non-Aligned Movement.
34	Thailand	Bangkok	14–16 November 2012	State visit. Met with Prime Minister Yingluck Shinawatra to discuss agriculture and trade ties.
35	Sri Lanka	Colombo	26–28 November 2012	Three-day official state visit. Met with President Mahinda Rajapaksa to discuss agricultural cooperation and trade.
36	Russia	Moscow	10–13 December 2012	Official visit. Met with President Vladimir Putin at the Kremlin to discuss bilateral economic, trade, military, and energy cooperation.
37	South Korea	Seoul	28–30 May 2013	State visit. Met with President Park Geun-hye to enhance bilateral development and infrastructure partnerships.
38	United States	Washington, D.C.	5–6 August 2014	Attended the United States–Africa Leaders Summit hosted by President Barack Obama.
39	Ethiopia	Addis Ababa	3–5 December 2014	Official state visit. Met with Prime Minister Hailemariam Desalegn to discuss regional trade and security.
40	China	Beijing, Sanya	26–31 March 2015	State visit. Attended the Boao Forum for Asia and held bilateral talks with Chinese President Xi Jinping and Premier Li Keqiang.
41	Japan	Tokyo	8–11 September 2015	Working visit. Held bilateral talks with Prime Minister Shinzo Abe.
42	Sudan	Khartoum	15–16 September 2015	Official working visit. Met with President Omar al-Bashir to normalize bilateral relations and discuss South Sudan peace efforts.
43	Italy	Rome, Vatican City	17–19 October 2015	Working visit. Held an audience with Pope Francis ahead of the papal visit to Uganda and met with Italian government representatives.
44	India	New Delhi	26–29 October 2015	Official visit. Attended the 3rd India–Africa Forum Summit and held bilateral talks with Prime Minister Narendra Modi.
45	Saudi Arabia	Riyadh	13–14 December 2015	Two-day official state visit. Met with King Salman bin Abdulaziz Al Saud to discuss economic and diplomatic cooperation.
46	France	Paris	17–19 September 2016	Working visit. Met with President François Hollande and spoke before French business executives at MEDEF.
47	Sudan	Khartoum	10–11 October 2016	Official visit. Attended the closing ceremony of Sudan's National Dialogue Conference.
48	Qatar	Doha	18–19 April 2017	Official state visit. Held bilateral talks with Emir Sheikh Tamim bin Hamad Al Thani.
49	Egypt	Cairo	8–9 May 2018	State visit. Met with President Abdel Fattah el-Sisi to discuss trade, bilateral cooperation, and Nile water management.
50	China	Beijing	2–5 September 2018	Attended the Forum on China–Africa Cooperation (FOCAC) Summit and held bilateral talks with President Xi Jinping.
51	United Kingdom	London	11–12 October 2018	Attended the Illegal Wildlife Trade Conference in London, calling on world leaders to address poverty as a key driver of wildlife poaching.
52	Kenya	Mombasa	27–28 March 2019	Two-day state visit. Attended joint economic and bilateral commission talks with President Uhuru Kenyatta.
53	Zimbabwe	Bulawayo	25–26 April 2019	Two-day official visit. Served as special guest of honor at the Zimbabwe International Trade Fair at the invitation of President Emmerson Mnangagwa.
54	China	Beijing, Changsha	24–27 June 2019	Four-day working visit. Attended the inaugural China–Africa Economic and Trade Expo in Changsha and met with Chinese leadership.
55	Japan	Yokohama	28–30 August 2019	Attended the 7th Tokyo International Conference on African Development (TICAD7).
56	Ethiopia	Addis Ababa	10 October 2019	Attended high-level regional political summits alongside regional heads of state.
57	Russia	Sochi	23–24 October 2019	Attended the inaugural 2019 Russia–Africa Summit, co-chaired by Russian President Vladimir Putin and Egyptian President Abdel Fattah el-Sisi. Held bilateral discussions with Russian officials on expanding political, economic, scientific, and technological cooperation between Uganda and Russia.

== 2020s ==
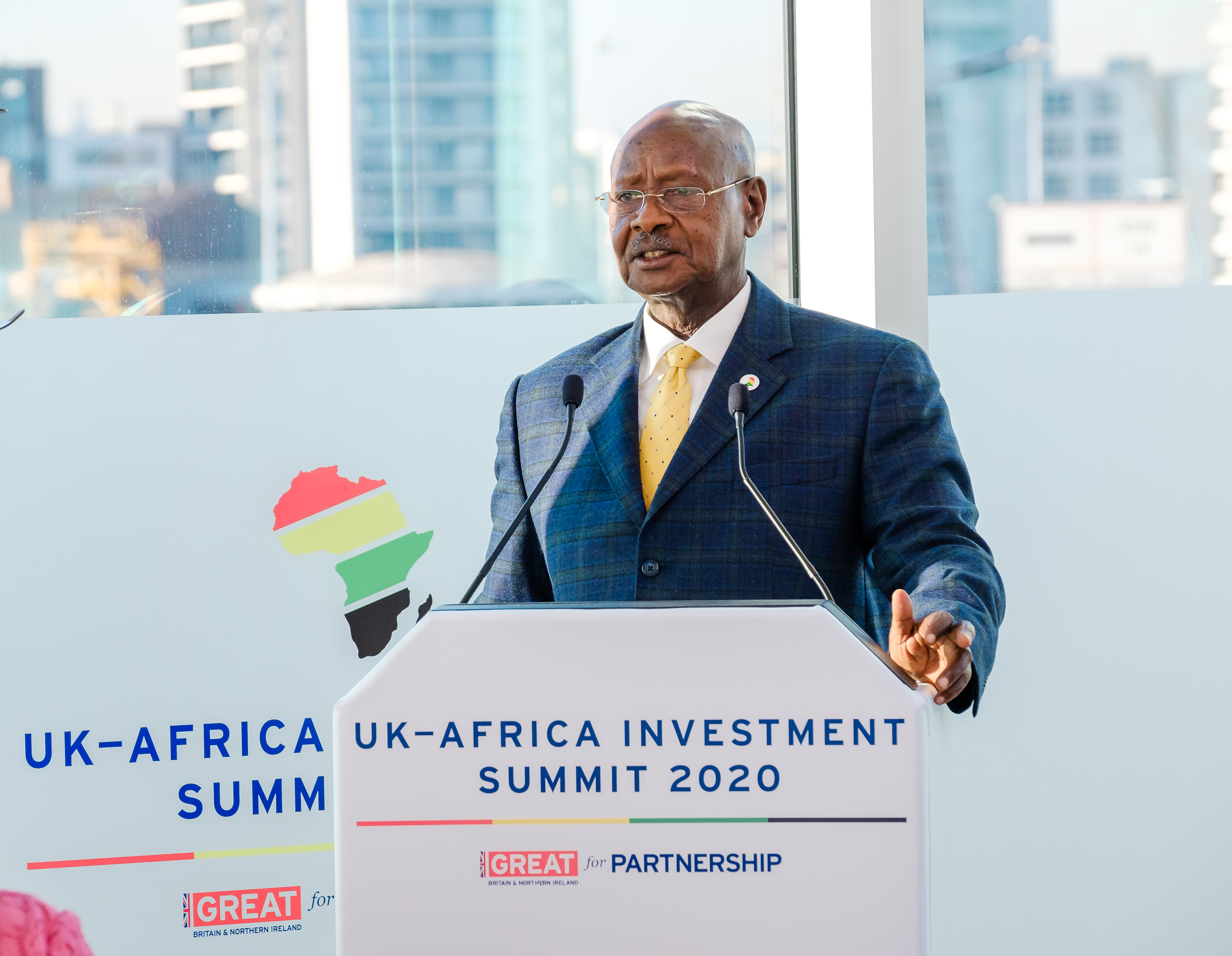
Museveni speaking at the UK–Africa Investment Summit in London, January 2020

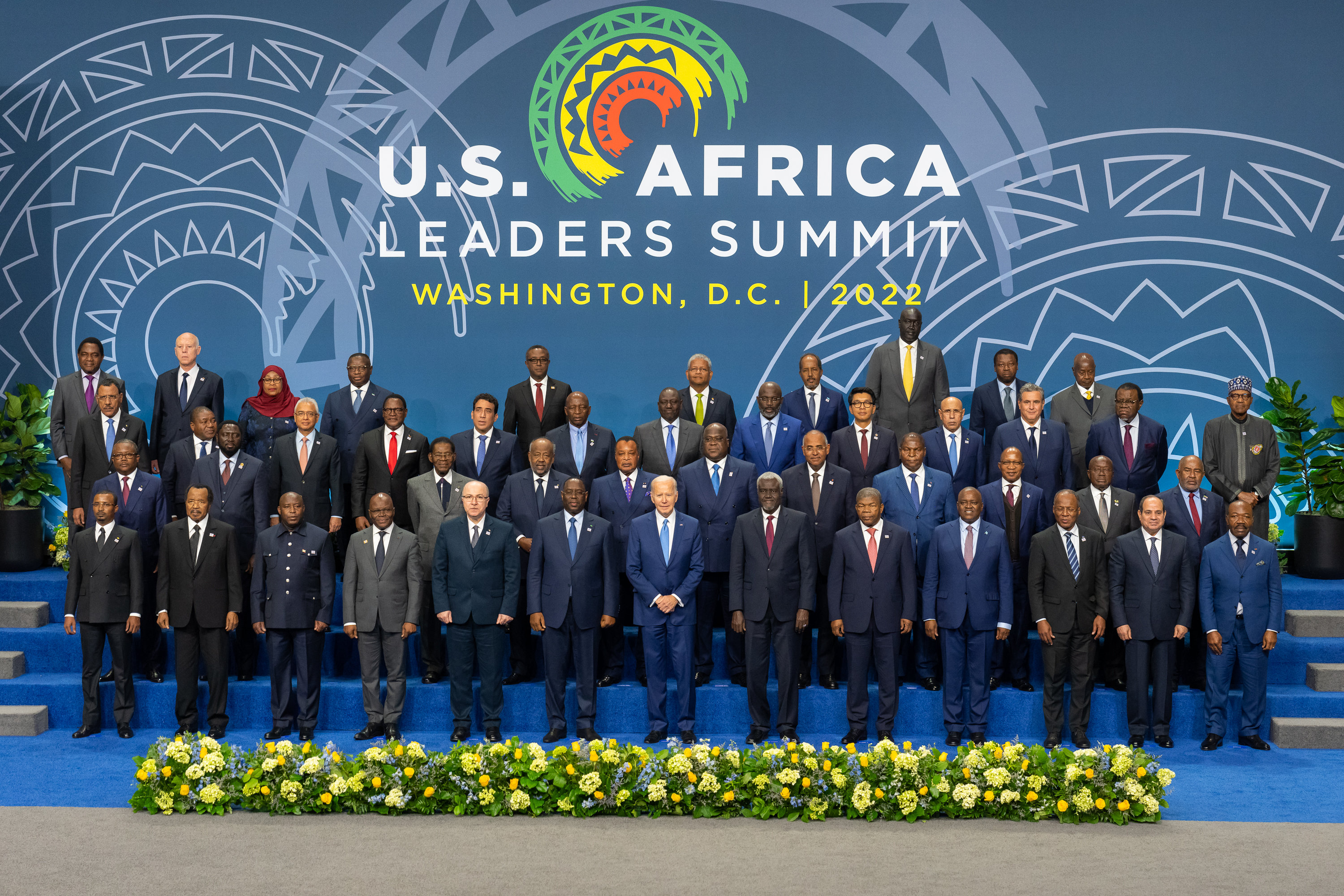
Museveni and US President Joe Biden at the United States–Africa Leaders Summit in Washington, D.C., in December 2022

#	Country	Areas visited	Dates	Details
58	Togo	Lomé	17–18 January 2020	Attended a high-level continental summit focused on counter-drug trafficking and fake medicines initiatives.
59	United Kingdom	London	20 January 2020	Attended the UK-Africa Investment Summit in London and held bilateral talks with UK Prime Minister Boris Johnson to encourage British investment in Uganda.
60	South Sudan	Juba	15 August 2020	Official visit. Participated in regional peace negotiations and bilateral trade talks.
61	Tanzania	Dar es Salaam	20 May 2021	Official visit. Met with President Samia Suluhu Hassan and witnessed the signing of the Host Government Agreement (HGA) for the East African Crude Oil Pipeline (EACOP).
62	Tanzania	Dar es Salaam, Chato	27–29 November 2021	Three-day State Visit. Toured the Port of Dar es Salaam, inspected SGR rail construction, handed over a primary school in Chato, and paid respects to the late President John Magufuli.
63	Senegal	Dakar	12 February 2022	One-day working visit at the invitation of President Macky Sall to discuss African Union governance.
64	Vietnam	Hanoi	23–25 November 2022	Three-day official visit. Met with President Nguyễn Xuân Phúc and Prime Minister Phạm Minh Chính to expand bilateral trade and agricultural ties.
65	United States	Washington, D.C.	13–15 December 2022	Attended the United States–Africa Leaders Summit hosted by President Joe Biden.
66	United Kingdom	London	16–17 December 2022	Working visit following the U.S.–Africa Leaders Summit. Met with UK political and business leaders.
67	United Arab Emirates	Abu Dhabi	15–17 January 2023	Working visit. Met with leadership during Sustainability Week to hold investment talks.
68	South Africa	Pretoria	28 February 2023	State visit. Met with President Cyril Ramaphosa to discuss bilateral trade.
69	Algeria	Algiers	11–13 March 2023	State visit. Met with President Abdelmadjid Tebboune to sign energy and economic agreements.
70	Russia	Saint Petersburg	27–28 July 2023	Attended the 2023 Russia–Africa Summit. Held bilateral talks with President Vladimir Putin.
71	Kenya	Nairobi	15–17 May 2024	State visit. Held regional trade discussions with President William Ruto.
72	United Arab Emirates	Abu Dhabi	13–14 November 2024	Working visit. Met with President Mohamed bin Zayed Al Nahyan.
73	United Arab Emirates	Abu Dhabi	13–15 January 2025	Working visit. Met with trade partners and investors in Abu Dhabi.
74	South Sudan	Juba	3–4 April 2025	Two-day working visit. Held high-level mediation talks with President Salva Kiir to de-escalate political tensions following the house arrest of First Vice President Riek Machar.
75	Kenya	Nairobi	30 July 2025	Bilateral working visit. Held talks with President William Ruto at State House Nairobi.
76	Egypt	Cairo	11–13 August 2025	Working visit. Addressed the Egypt–Uganda Business Forum.
77	Tanzania	Dar es Salaam	6 February 2026	Working visit. Met with President Samia Suluhu Hassan to deepen cooperation on energy, trade, and regional peace.
78	Tanzania	Arusha	8 March 2026	Official visit. Attended regional affairs talks before returning to Entebbe.
79	Kenya	Nairobi	23 April 2026	Working visit. Addressed a high-level summit calling for strategic infrastructure investment to drive Africa's industrial transformation.
80	Tanzania	Dar es Salaam	5–6 August 2026	Working visit. Met with President Samia Suluhu Hassan to launch a new phase of the Uganda–Tanzania energy partnership.
81	Kenya	Mokowe, Lamu County	30 September 2026	Working visit. Attended the groundbreaking ceremony of the Dangote East Africa Petroleum Refinery, hosted by President William Ruto and businessman Aliko Dangote, alongside other regional leaders. Museveni said the refinery would not conflict with Uganda's planned refinery or its cooperation with Tanzania on the Tanga pipeline.

== See also ==
- Foreign relations of Uganda
