= Mokowe =

- Location within Kenya Location within the Horn of Africa Location within Africa
- Coordinates: 2.236663°S 40.854991°E
- Country: Kenya
- County: Lamu County
- Elevation: 0.91 m (3 ft)
- Time zone: UTC+3 (EAT)

Mokowe is a small town in Kenya's Lamu County in what was previously Coast Province.

== Location ==
Mokowe is located on the Garsen–Witu–Lamu Highway, approximately 120 kilometres (75 mi), east of Garsen. It is the last town on the route to the Mokowe Jetty, about 3.5 kilometres (2 mi) away, from where boats leave for Lamu Island and the rest of the Lamu archipelago. The coordinates of Mokowe are 2°14'12.0"S, 40°51'18.0"E (Latitude:-2.236663; Longitude:40.854991).

== Overview ==
The main health facility is Mokowe Health Centre. The town also has a post office, a police station, a branch of Kenya Commercial Bank and a branch of Postbank Kenya.

== See also ==
- List of roads in Kenya
