= Furaha =

- Location within Kenya
- Coordinates: 2.48°S 40.2°E
- Country: Kenya
- County: Tana River County
- Time zone: UTC+3 (EAT)

Furaha is a settlement in Kenya's Tana River County.

Furaha has also lent its name to a popular spirits brand, Furaha Brandy and Furaha Gin, produced by Africa Spirits Limited.
