= Isebania–Kisii–Ahero Road =

Road in Kenya

Coordinates: 00°46′13″S 34°35′55″E

Route information
- Length: 107 mi (172 km)
- History: Designated in 2016; Completion in 2019 (Expected)

Major junctions
- South end: Isebania
- Migori; Kisii
- North end: Ahero

Location
- Country: Kenya

Highway system
- Transport in Kenya

The Isebania–Kisii–Ahero Road is a road section of the A1 road in Kenya, connecting the towns of Isebania, Migori, Kisii and Ahero.

== Location ==
The road starts at Isebania, Migori County, at the international border with Tanzania. It takes a general northerly route, through Migori, Kisii, and Sondu, to end at Ahero, on the Kisumu–Kericho Highway, a total distance of 178 kilometres (111 mi). The road distance of the road project is 172 kilometres (107 mi).

== Overview ==
This road, is an important trade corridor between Tanzania, Kenya and South Sudan. It links four Kenyan counties and for the residents of these communities, it is a vital trade and transportation link to Kisumu and Nairobi, two of the largest cities in the country. As at April 2016, the road surface has deteriorated and is heavily potholed.

== Accidents and Black-spots ==
For the traffic that it has, the Kisii-Sirare road is too narrow. In some occasions, overtaking vehicles (particularly buses and trailers) have to get one set of wheels to overlap the road as there is not enough space. Large vehicles also have to slow down when they meet as it is often that one of them, or both of them, will have to get the outside set of wheels off the road. These are factors that have led to many pedestrians and cyclists being hit.

The existence of Sony Sugar Millers at Awendo also means that the public have to share the road with the much slower cane-hauling tractors. Because the tractors usually no lights at the back, and at the front seem deceptively narrow that they would be mistaken for motorbikes, their use of the road at night have led to several accidents, like this one here which led to nine injuries and three deaths. The most common accident spots along the Rongo-Sirare section are Matafari, just after Rongo, and a slope before Kanga from Rongo, near the Olando River. Several trucks and vans have also plunged into the Kuja River near St. Jonathan Primary. In June 2016, a head-on collision between a bus and a track resulted in several deaths and injuries on the bridge. This was the third accident on the same spot in the same year.

Tales among locals also hold that Nairobi-bound buses are the most carelessly driven vehicles on the road. Bikers and Probox matatus also flout traffic rules, increasing vulnerability to accidents. There have been attempts to make the Kisii-Rongo section safer with a number of speed bumps having been installed.

== Schools along the road ==
While there are a number of public primary schools that are easily accessible from the road, including the famous Kanga Primary School, public high schools are fewer. The most popular, in this regard, include Itierio Boys Secondary School, Itierio Girls Secondary School, Koderobara Secondary School (2 km off the main road at Rongo town), Kanga High School (800 m off the road), Uriri High School, and Isibania Boys High School. There is also Rongo University Town Campus. Private institutions along the road include Mt. Kenya University Kisii Campus (formerly Pace Academy), Kamagambo SDA Schools (Primary, High School, and TTC).

== Hospitals accessible from the road ==
Hospitals that you can easily access from the road include the Kisii Level V hospital, which is also known as the Kisii Teaching and Referral Hospital (KTRH) RAM hospital at Kisii, Nyangena Hospital at Daraja Mbili, just after Kisii, Tabaka Hospital, five kilometers off Nyachenge town, Lwala Community Center which is located a few kilometers off the Sare-Kamagambo bus stop. In addition to these, there is the Rongo Level IV hospital at Rongo town, Rapcom Medical Center and Awendo Health Center, both at Awendo, and Ombo Mission Hospital.

== Major towns ==
Major towns along the road include Kisii, Suneka, Rongo, Ranen, Awendo, Migori, Isibania, and Sirare.

== Security ==
In the recent years past, locals complained of harassment by thieves at night by thieves at Komire. Komire has a small man-made forest on either side of the road that must have provided night cover for the thieves. However, with streetlights being installed along the streets in major towns and in such places, security has improved.

== Upgrade and funding ==
On 30 March 2016, the African Development Bank approved a loan of US$228 million to the Government of Kenya, to apply to the rehabilitation of this road, from 2016 until 2019. Other contributors to the funding of the rehabilitation are illustrated in the table below:

Sources of Funds for Rehabilitation of Isebania–Kisii–Ahero Road
Rank	Name of Funder	Amount in US Dollars	Percentage
1	African Development Bank	228.13 million	81.4
2	Government of Kenya	40.92 million	14.6
3	EU-Africa Infrastructure Trust Fund	11.21 million	4.0
	Total	280.26 million	100.00

^{*Note: Totals may be slightly off due to rounding.}

== See also ==
- List of roads in Kenya
- East African Community
