= High Grand Falls Power Station =

High Grand Falls Dam
- Location of High Grand Falls Hydroelectric Power Station; Placement on map is approximate
- Location: Kibuka Falls, Kenya
- Coordinates: 00°05′09″S 38°16′48″E
- Construction began: 2025 Expected
- Opening date: 2031 Expected
- Construction cost: US$2 billion
- Owner: GBM Engineering Consortium

Dam and spillways
- Type of dam: Gravity dam
- Impounds: Tana River

Power Station
- Turbines: 7
- Installed capacity: 693 MW (929,000 hp)

The High Grand Falls Hydroelectric Power Station, also High Grand Falls Dam, is a planned hydroelectric power station across the Tana River that harnesses the energy of the Kibuka Falls, in Kenya. The planned capacity of the power station is 693 megawatts (929,000 hp). The station is expected to be the most powerful hydroelectric energy source in Kenya.

== Location ==
The power station would lie at Kibuka Falls, across the Tana River, a in the vicinity of Mwingi National Reserve, at the border between Kitui County and Tharaka-Nithi County, approximately 280 kilometres (170 mi) north-east of the city of Nairobi, the country's capital and its largest city. This location is downstream of the Seven Forks Scheme.

== Overview ==
This development is part of the Lamu Port and Lamu-Southern Sudan-Ethiopia Transport Corridor project (LAPSSET). The dam is expected to create a lake with a surface area of 165 square kilometres (41,000 acres) and holding 5,600,000,000 cubic metres (2.0×10^{11} ft^{3}) of water. An estimated 4,500 families in Kitui and Tharaka Nithi counties, are expected to be displaced by the new dam. In addition to the planned 693 megawatts of electricity, the dam will provide water for the irrigation of more than 250,000 hectares (620,000 acres) of farmland. The dam is also expected to mitigate flooding in the coastal counties during the rainy season.

== History ==
The idea to build this dam was conceived in 2009, during the Mwai Kibaki presidency. Following a tendering process, a British entity, GBM Engineering Consortium, based in London, was the only qualifier for the tender. GBM beat six other international construction firms, five of them Chinese. Once initiated, construction is expected to last six years.

== Ownership ==
The consortium that is developing the dam and power station, will design, fund, build, own, operate and transfer the project, after recovering their investment, during 20 years of ownership, following commercial commissioning.

== Construction costs ==
The estimated costs for the dam and power plant is estimated at US$2 billion (KSh200 billion).

== Timetable ==
The dam and power station will be developed in phases. The first phase, with generation capacity of 495 megawatts (664,000 hp), is expected to come online in 2031. The second phase, with capacity of another 198 megawatts (266,000 hp) is expected online in 2032.

== See also ==
- List of power stations in Kenya
- Energy in Kenya
