= Malindi–Bagamoyo Highway =

Road in Kenya and Tanzania

Coordinates: 04°36′05″S 39°06′20″E

A14 Road
- Malindi–Bagamoyo Highway
- Malindi–Bagamoyo Highway highlighted in red

Route information
- Length: 421 mi (678 km)
- History: Designated in 2017 (Expected); Completion in 2022 (Expected)

Major junctions
- North end: Malindi
- Mombasa; Lunga Lunga; Tanga
- South end: Bagamoyo

Location
- Country: Kenya

Highway system
- Transport in Kenya

The Malindi–Bagamoyo Highway, also Coastline Transnational Highway, is a road in Kenya and Tanzania, connecting the cities of Malindi and Mombasa in Kenya to Tanga and Bagamoyo in Tanzania.

== Location ==
=== Within Kenya ===
The road starts at Malindi, Kenya and makes its way southwards for 110 kilometres (68 mi) to Mombasa, with this portion of the road designated officially as part of route B8, a national trunk road.

The road then continues south for 106 kilometres (66 mi) through the town of Lunga Lunga and onward to the nearby border with Tanzania, with this portion of the road designated officially as the entirety of route A14, an international trunk road.

The total distance within Kenya is approximately 216 kilometres (134 mi).

=== Within Tanzania ===
From the border, the road will continue to Tanga, then on through Pangani before bypassing the Saadani National Park and ending at Bagamoyo. The road contract distance is 460 kilometres (286 mi). As of December 2023, phase one of this project was 35 percent complete.

== Overview ==
The highway is expected to improve cross-border trade, tourism, socio-economic development and promote regional integration. The project is being handled directly by the East African Community. The road is also expected to ease the movement of traffic from both Mombasa and Tanga ports, destined for the land-locked countries of Uganda, Rwanda, Burundi, South Sudan and DR Congo.

The USD 751.3 million upgrade is jointly funded by the European Union and African Development Bank, with 70 percent borrowed from the AfDB, and each country funding 30 percent of the work in its territory.

== Upgrading and widening ==
The Mombasa–Kilifi section is divided into two contracts: Nyali Bridge–Mtwapa Bridge and Mtwapa–Kilifi, with a four-lane dual carriageway through Mombasa and Mtwapa, and a new Mtwapa Bridge. From Kwa Kadzengo, the upgraded road continues as a single carriageway to Kilifi.

Construction of the Mombasa–Mtwapa section began in November 2022, and was approximately 56 per cent complete by September 2026. Completion, originally envisaged for November 2025, has been pushed to December 2027. The National Assembly's Transport Committee has been sharply critical of the slow progress.

The Mtwapa–Kilifi section was reported to be 76 per cent complete in June 2026. Concerns have been raised about prolonged construction, poor road conditions, and congestion during the works.

The Kilifi-Malindi section is envisaged to include a Malindi bypass. Works on this section and the one between Likoni and Lunga Lunga are yet to commence, although KeNHA has sought consultancy services to review feasibility studies, environmental assessments, resettlement plans and engineering designs.

In Tanzania, construction on the Tanga–Pangani–Makurunge section is ongoing. The Tanga–Pangani section was reported 77 per cent complete in February 2026, with the Pangani River bridge and approach roads at approximately 80 per cent. The Tungamaa–Mkange section was approximately 57 per cent complete. Design work for Mkange–Makurunge was complete, but funding was still being sought.

== See also ==
- List of roads in Kenya
- List of roads in Tanzania
- East African Community
