= Thokoa =

Town in Kitui County, Kenya

Coordinates: 1°03′S 38°01′E

Thokoa is a small town in the Kyome/Thaana Ward, Kitui County, Kenya. It's located along the Mwingi - Kitui road. The village got its name from Thokoa rock which one kilometre from the shopping centre.
