= Mambrui =

- Location within Kenya
- Coordinates: 3.12°S 40.15°E
- Country: Kenya
- Province: Coast Province
- Time zone: UTC+3 (EAT)

Mambrui is a settlement in Kenya's Coast Province, located east of Marikebuni along the Malindi-Garissa Road, south of Gongoni and north of Malindi.

== History ==
Mambrui also boasts of 14th century architecture with over five buildings built in the 14th century though in a dilapidated condition. The village also is home to 11 mosques despite having approximately 200 households.

The discovery of a Yongle Tongbao coin in Manda, about 130 km further north, in 2010 drove speculations of more extensive trade relations between China and the Swahili Coast than previously thought, at least decades before the arrival of Vasco Da Gama. The theory found further backing in the discovery of porcelain shard originating from a Chinese imperial klain. A Chinese archeology team that spent several years excavating the surroundings of the town are yet to validate the hypothesis.

== See also ==
- Historic Swahili Settlements
