= Bura, Tana River County =

Bura
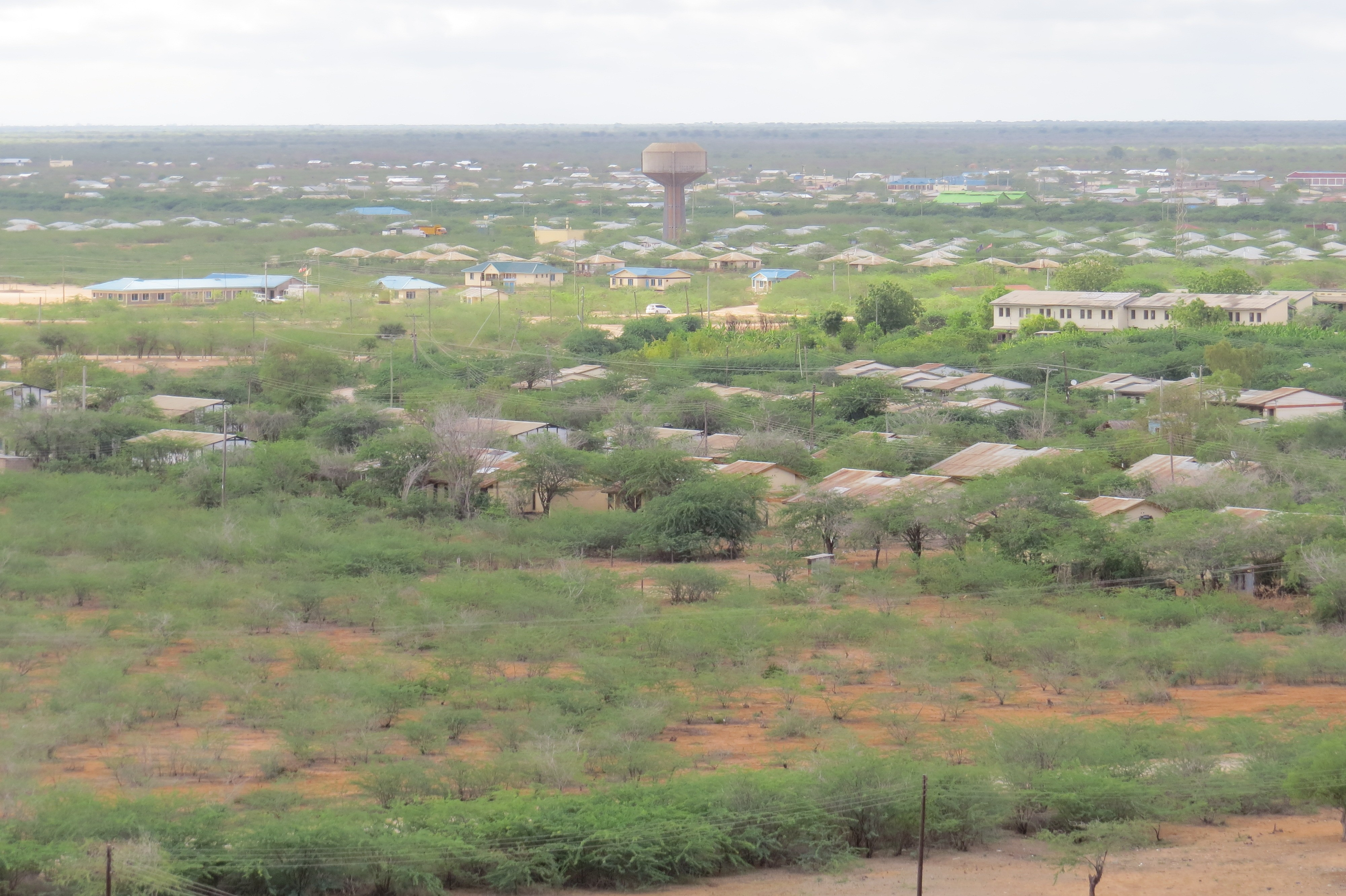
- Skyline of Bura town.

- Location within Kenya
- Country: Kenya
- County: [Tana River County]
- Elevation: 105 m (344 ft)
- Time zone: UTC+3 (EAT0)

Bura is a town in Tana River County, Kenya.

== Location ==
The town lies on the west bank of the Tana River, approximately 50 km north of Hola, the headquarters of Tana River County. It is about 100 km south of Garissa town. The coordinates of Bura are: 1°11'39.1S, 39°50'23.0"E (Latitude:-1.503606; Longitude:39.837802).

Bura (Kenya)

== Overview ==
Bura is also known as Bura-Tana and Bura-West with postal code 70104. It is most known for being the centre for the Bura Irrigation and Settlement Project. The water treatments works in Bura town are a landmark that can be seen from 20 km. Bura West hosts Bura airport (IATA: n/a, ICAO: HKBR), which sits at an average altitude of 344 feet (105 m).

Watering point in Tana River County, near Bura, Kenya
