= Garsen =

- Location within Kenya
- Coordinates: 02°16′04″S 40°06′38″E
- Country: Kenya
- County: Tana River County
- Elevation: 28 m (92 ft)

Population (2009 Census)
  - Urban: 2,904
- Time zone: UTC+3 (EAT)

Garsen is a small town located in Tana River County, Kenya. It is on the west bank of the Tana River.

== Location ==
Garsen is located on the banks of the Tana River, in Tana River County, approximately 100 kilometres (62 mi) south of Hola, the location of the county headquarters. It lies along the Malindi–Garissa Road, approximately 112 kilometres (70 mi) north of Malindi.

== Overview ==
Garsen marks the western end of the 122 kilometres (76 mi) Garsen–Witu–Lamu Highway.

== See also ==
- List of roads in Kenya
