= Garissa County =

- County
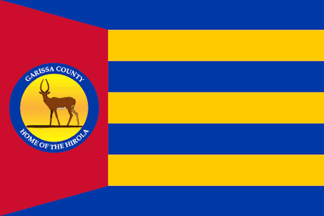
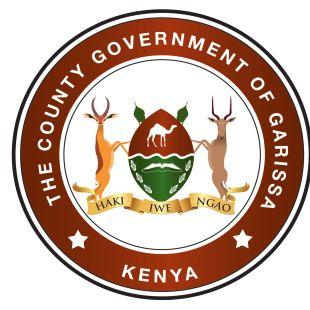
- Flag Coat of arms

- Location in Kenya
- Coordinates: 0°27′25″S 39°39′30″E
- Country: Kenya
- Formed: 4 March 2013
- Capital: Garissa

Government
  - Governor: Mohammed Muktar Shidiye
  - Deputy Governor: Abdi Dagane Muhumed
  - Senator: Abdul Mohammed Haji
  - County woman representative: Amina Udgoon Siyad

Area
  - Total: 50,000 km^{2} (19,000 sq mi)
- Elevation: 1,138 m (3,734 ft)

Population (2025)
  - Total: 1,200,000
  - Density: 24/km^{2} (62/sq mi)

GDP (PPP)
  - GDP: ▲$1.594 billion (41st)(2022)
  - Per Capita: ▲$1,761 (2022) (45th)

GDP (NOMINAL)
  - GDP: ▲$585 Million (2022) (41st)
  - Per Capita: ▲$647 (2022) (45th)
- Time zone: UTC+3 (EAT)
- Website: www.garissa.go.ke

Garissa County is a county in Kenya located in Eastern Kenya bordering Somalia to the East, Wajir County and Isiolo County to the North, Tana River County to the West, Lamu County to the South and the Indian Ocean. Its capital and largest urban area is Garissa.

The county was created by the 2010 Constitution of Kenya as a new unit of the devolved government. Prior to the 2010 constitution, Garissa County was part of the North Eastern Province which was one of the former provinces of Kenya. The North Eastern Province was carved out of the then Northern Frontier District (NFD) prior to independence.

The county had a population of 841,353 at the 2019 Census, and a land area of about 44,753 km^{2} (17,279 sq mi). The majority of the population in Garissa County is of Somali ethnic background. This includes subgroups like the Ogaden, Degodia, Ajuran, and others. There are also smaller populations of other ethnic groups.

== Administrative and political units ==
=== Political leadership ===
Nathif Jama Adam was elected as the pioneer governor of Garissa in March 2013. Ali Bunow Korane became the second governor in 2017 however Nathif was re-elected in 2022. Nathif is currently deputised by Abdi Dagane Muhumed.

The current elected Senator of the county is Sen. Abdul Mohammed Haji while the current County woman representative is Hon. Amina Udgoon Siyad.

==== County Executive Committee (CEC) ====
Every County Government in Kenya has a County Executive Committee (CEC) who are persons the Governor appoints, with the approval of the assembly. The CEC implements and coordinates the development projects of the County. The committee also implements the laws the County Assembly passes and ensures compliance from the various county departments. Below is a list of the current CECs of Garissa County:

Name	Department
Mohamud Hassan Mursal	County Secretary
Hassan Abdirizak	Agriculture, Livestock & Pastoral Economy
Osman Noor	Finance and Economic Planning
Ahmed Mohamed	Water, Environment, Climate Change & Natural Resources
Zahra Musa	County Affairs, Public Service & Intergovernmental Relations
Ebla Minhaj	Education, Information & ICT
Ahmednadhir Omar	Health & Sanitation
Hawa Abdi	Culture, Gender, Youth & Sports
Mohamed Suleiman	Trade, Investments & Enterprise Development
Nasir Mohamed	Roads, Transport & Public Works
Mohamed Hussein	Lands, Physical Planning & Urban Development
Khadija Mohamed	County Attorney

=== Administrative units ===
Garissa County has 6 constituencies. The below is the list of all Constituencies and the current elected Member of Parliament (MP) for each constituency:

Constituency	Member of Parliament (MP)
Garissa	Hon. Mohamed Dekow Barrow
Fafi	Hon. Salah Yakub Farah
Dadaab	Hon. Farah Maalim
Lagdera	Hon. Abdikadir Hussein Mohamed
Balambala	Hon. Abdi Omar Shurie
Ijara	Hon. Abdi Ali Abdi

==== Electoral Wards ====
Garissa County is further subdivided into 30 electoral wards. Each ward is represented by a Member of the County Assembly (MCA) or also known as Ward Representative whose main roles are legislation, representation, and oversight. The current speaker of the County Assembly is Abdi Idle Gure.

The list below shows all the wards of the county and the current elected MCA for each Ward:

Constituency	Electoral Ward	Member of County Assembly (MCA)
Garissa Township Constituency	Waberi	Abubakar Haji Sugow
Garissa Township Constituency	Galbet	Abubakar Mohamed Khalif
Garissa Township Constituency	Township	Hussein Mohamed Dagane
Garissa Township Constituency	Iftin	Musdaf Abdirashid Ahmed
Balambala Constituency	Balambala	Abdi Ibrahim Daar
Balambala Constituency	Danyere	Idris Ismail Aden
Balambala Constituency	Jarajara	Adan Hussein Durow
Balambala Constituency	Saka	Abdiweli Aden Abdullahi
Balambala Constituency	Sankuri	Abdirahman Mohamed Ali
Lagdera Constituency	Modogashe	Mahat Abdikadir Ibrahim
Lagdera Constituency	Benane	Abdiqayum Sugow Nurow
Lagdera Constituency	Goreale	Fakrudin Haji Sadik
Lagdera Constituency	Maalimin	Hajir Mahat Farah
Lagdera Constituency	Sabena	Issa Aden Abdi
Lagdera Constituency	Baraki	Hassan Dahir Noor
Dadaab Constituency	Dertu	Aden Hassan Odowa
Dadaab Constituency	Dadaab	Mohamed Abdi Farah (Aboo)
Dadaab Constituency	Labasigale	Mohamed Sheikh Abdisalat
Dadaab Constituency	Damajale	Omar Abdi Hassan
Dadaab Constituency	Liboi	Ahmed Abdirahman Shiekh
Dadaab Constituency	Abakaile	Hajir Mohamed Dahiye
Fafi Constituency	Bura	Ali Abdihakim Haret
Fafi Constituency	Dekaharia	Ahmed Noor Aden
Fafi Constituency	Jarajila	Noor Sheikh Farah
Fafi Constituency	Fafi	Hassan Aden Kolosho
Fafi Constituency	Nanighi	Abdullahi Ibrahim Sigat
Ijara Constituency	Hulugho	Adow Omar Said
Ijara Constituency	Sangailu	Abdi Muhyadin Abdi
Ijara Constituency	Ijara	Abdirahman Muktar Muhumed
Ijara Constituency	Masalani	Yunis Abdi Ibrahim

== Demographics ==
Garissa county had a total population of 841,353 persons of which 458,975 were males, 382,344 females and 34 intersex person. There was a total of 141,394 household with an average size of 5.9 persons per house hold. It has a population density of 19 persons per square kilometre based on the 2019 Kenya Population and Housing Census.

Distribution of Population, Land Area and Population Density by Sub-County

Sub County	Area (km^{2})	Population 2019 Census	Popn. density
Balambala	3,684	32,257	8.8
Dadaab	6,415	185,252	28.9
Fafi	15,050	134,030	8.9
Garissa	3,318	163,914	49.4
Hulugho	7,737	133,984	17.3
Ijara	2,453	141,591	57.7
Lagdera	6,096	50,315	8.3
Totals	44,753	841,353	18.8

=== Religion & Ethnicity ===
Most of the inhabitants of Garissa County are ethnically Somali and are predominantly Muslim.

Religion in Garissa County
1. Christianity (2.20%)
2. Islam (97.6%)
3. Other religions (including Atheism) (0.20%)

== Education ==
The county has 347 ECD centres, 224 primary schools, 41 secondary schools, 2 teachers training colleges and 2 public universities.

39.7 per cent of the population can read and write and 57.9 cannot read and write. There is an average of 8.2 per cent literacy level and 74 per cent are illiterate.

School and Tertiary Institutions
Category	No of Public	No of Private	Total
ECD	210	137	347
Primary School	173	51	224
Secondary School	25	16	41
Youth Polytechnic	2	0	2
Teachers Training Colleges	2	0	2
Technical Institutions	1	0	1
Universities	1	2	3

== Health ==
There are a total of 111 health facilities distributes across the county, one level 5, 14 other hospitals, 29 health centres and 67 dispensaries.

Most Prevalent Diseases
Diseases	Percentage
Upper Respiratory Tract Infections	30.9
Urinary Tract Infection	15.2
Diarrhoeal diseases	9.5
Diseases of the skin	7.4
Pneumonia	6.7

HIV/ADS is at the 1 percentage as compared to the national prevalent rate of 5.6 percentage.

== Transport and communication ==
A total of 2,700.6 km is classified as road network coverage comprising 1,637.84 km under county government and 1,062.76 km under national government. Of the total road network 420 km is covered by gravelled surface, 2,245.1 km earth surface and .5 km of bitumen surface.

There are 6 postal services with 2,600 installed letter boxes, 2,496 rented letter boxes, and 104 vacant letter boxes.

== Trade and commerce ==
The main crops grown are maize, greengrams, sorghum, rice, cowpeas, bananas, mangoes, pawpaw, water melon, tomatoes, capsicum and onions. Farmers have an average size of 1.5 hectares for small scale and 20 hectares for large scale. cattle (boran), goats (galla), sheep (black headed Persian) and camel (dromedary one humped) are kept as the main livestock for producing key products of meat, milk, hides and skins.

== Services and urbanisation ==
Stats for Garissa County
County	Status for the County (Per cent)
Urbanisation	23.5
Literacy	52.4
Attending School (15-18 Yrs)	43.9
Paved Roads	0
Good Roads	54.1
Electricity Access	11.6
Poverty Rate	49.2
Stats for the County

Source: USAid Kenya

== See also ==
- Garissa
- Garissa District
- North Eastern Province (Kenya)
- Northern Frontier District
- Mandera County
- Isiolo County
- Lamu County
- Wajir County
- Counties of Kenya
- Sub-Counties of Kenya
- Garissa Solar Power Station
- List of counties of Kenya by GDP
- Garissa massacre
- Garissa University College attack
- Lamu–Garissa–Isiolo Road
- Garissa–Nuno–Modogashe–Wajir Road
- Mombasa–Garissa Road
- Garissa Airport
