= Tana River County =

- County
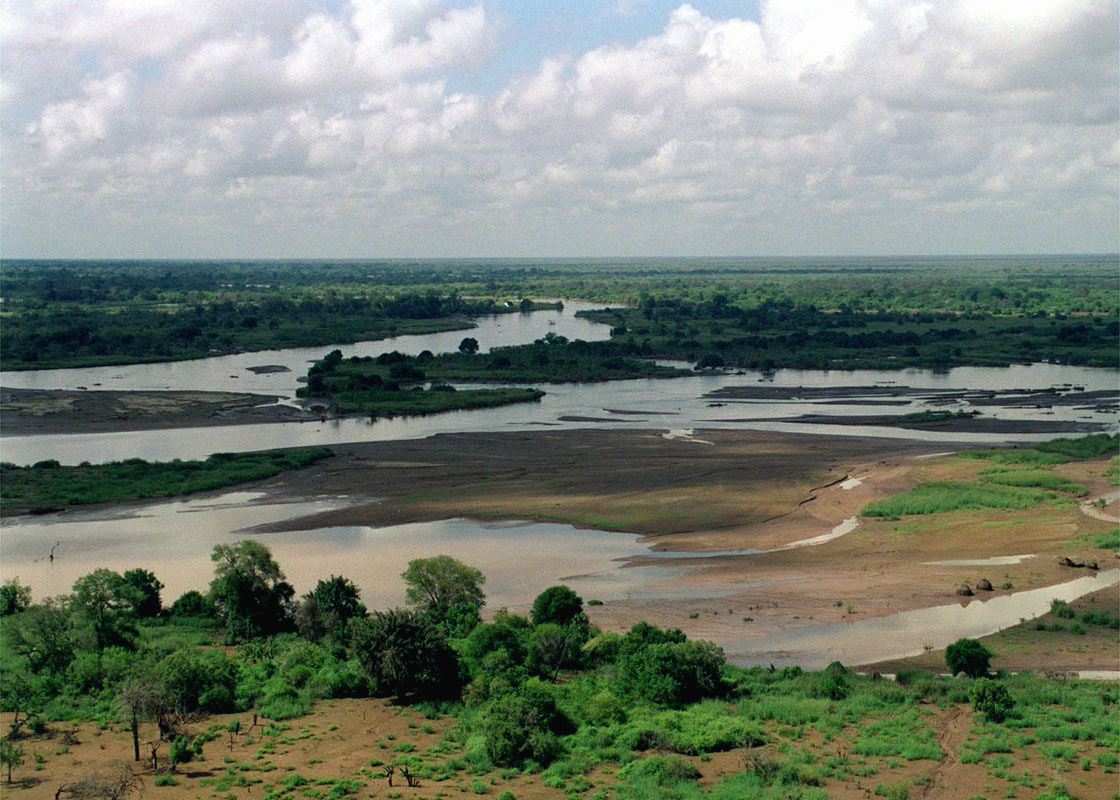
- Tana

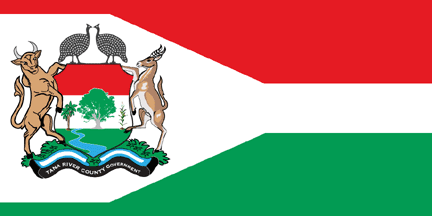
- Flag

- Location in Kenya
- Coordinates: 1°30′S 40°0′E
- Country: Kenya
- Formed: 4 March 2013
- Capital: Hola

Government
  - Governor: Godhana Dhadho Gaddae

Area
  - Total: 35,375.8 km^{2} (13,658.7 sq mi)

Population (2019)
  - Total: 512,000
  - Density: 14.5/km^{2} (37.5/sq mi)

GDP (PPP)
  - GDP: ▼$818 Million (45th)(2022)
  - Per Capita: ▼$2,379 (2022) (45th)

GDP (NOMINAL)
  - GDP: ▼$301 Million (2022) (45th)
  - Per Capita: ▼$874 (2022) (42nd)
- Time zone: UTC+3 (EAT)
- Website: tanariver.go.ke

Tana River County is a county in the former Coast Province of Kenya. It is named after the Tana River, the longest river in Kenya. It has an area of 38,437 km^{2} (14,841 sq mi) and had a population of 315,943 as of the 2019 census. The county borders Kitui County to the west, Garissa County to the northeast, Isiolo County to the north, Lamu County to the southeast, Kilifi County to the south and the Indian ocean The administrative headquarters of the county is Hola also known as Galole. The County has five sub Counties; Tana Delta, Tana River, Tana North, Galedyertu, and Bangal.

Apart from the River Tana, there are several seasonal rivers in the county popularly known as Galan, which flows in a west–east direction from Kitui and Makueni Counties, draining into the River Tana and eventually into the Indian Ocean.

== The historic town of Ungwana ==
The historic town of Ungwana, near the mouth of the Tana River, is home to two important mosques that share a curious relationship with the great mosques of Gedi.

=== The Friday mosque: expansion and transformation ===
The city's Friday mosque, originally 17 metres long, featured an ogee arch framing the mihrab (prayer niche). Decorative coral bosses and the imprint of a lost square plaque (possibly ceramic or marble) adorned the lintel. Archaeological excavations have unearthed ceramic fragments dating to the 14th century, giving an indication of the possible date of the mosque's construction.

A significant extension to the east marked the early 15th century for the Friday mosque. This new rectangular section mirrored the length of the original structure but offered slightly more width. The prayer hall was divided into four bays separated by three rows of six square columns. The extension included additional entrances: four to the west provided access to the older section, while two with ogee arches to the east led to an antechamber and rooms flanking the mihrab.

A notable feature of this extension is the addition of an octagonal pillar directly opposite the mihrab and a substantial seven-step minbar built against the qibla wall. The back of the minbar had intricate plaster mouldings, and small holes indicated the presence of a former wooden balustrade. These changes, estimated to have occurred between 1400 and 1450, raise intriguing questions about the motivations behind such a significant transformation.

=== Interesting parallels with Gedi ===
The timing of this expansion of the Friday mosque coincides with the construction of the new Grand Mosque in Gedi. This synchronicity suggests a possible connection, possibly related to a wider religious or political shift in the region around the mouth of the Tana River and Mida Bay. In particular, the addition of the third column opposite the mihrab may not have been purely functional but may reflect the influence of another Muslim sect within the community.

=== The second mosque ===
Ungwana boasts a second mosque with a collection of intriguing architectural elements. The northern section of this mosque retains its original teak lintels imported from India, intricately carved with alveolar motifs. The mihrab arch has a unique design, combining an ogee shape with a semicircle at the apex. The structure displays a rich array of decorative elements, including inlaid ceramics on the lintel and tympanum, an architrave decorated with fish bone motifs, and single-block coral columns with inlaid panels.

The apse plan deviates from the norm, with triangular shapes and mouldings. In particular, the mihrab is surmounted by a bulbous dome topped with a ceramic celadon bottle, similar to that of the Fakhr al-Din mosque, instead of a semi-dome. This borrowing of the bulbous dome concept suggests a diffusion of styles across the region. However, its widespread adoption may have been limited by the complex construction techniques required.

=== Chronology and possibilities for further research ===
The existence and features of the second mosque present a fascinating chronological puzzle. Could it be that this 'second' structure was actually Ungwana's first great mosque, built in the 13th century? Perhaps it was later replaced by the larger Friday mosque, built in the 14th century and rebuilt in the 15th century.

The architectural legacy of Ungwana's mosques, with their intriguing parallels to Gedi and hints of external influences, offers a glimpse into the dynamic artistic and religious landscape of the Swahili coast. Further research, including a more comprehensive analysis of the archaeological data and a comparative study of regional architectural trends, is needed to fully unravel the chronological mysteries and understand the cultural exchanges that shaped these captivating structures.

== District subdivisions ==
Despite the large area of the Tana River district, its only local authority is Tana River County Council. The district has three constituencies: Garsen, Galole and Bura,15 wards, 54 locations, and 109 sub-Locations.

Administrative divisions
Division	Population*	Urban population*	population density	Area (km^{2})	Headquarters
Bangale	14,853	0	2	x	Murarandia
Bura	28,848	0	6	x	Bura
Galole	34,948	9,383	4	x	Hola
Garsen	51,592	4,885	4	x	Garsen
Kipini	16,243	0	19	x	Kipini
Madogo	21,731	0	12	x	Kamwangi
Wenje	12,686	0	23	x	Wenje
Total	180,901	14,268	5 (average)	x	
* 1999 census. Sources:

=== Religion ===
1. Christian (18.0%)
2. Muslim (81.0%)
3. Other Religions (Including Atheism) (1.00%)
Religion in Tana River County

The county consists of 81% Muslims, 18% Christians and 1% of people in other religions (including Atheism).

== Population ==
Historical population
Year	Pop.	±%
1979	92,401	—
1989	128,426	+39.0%
1999	180,901	+40.9%
2009	240,075	+32.7%
2019	315,943	+31.6%

The largest ethnic groups are the Orma and the Wardey Somali people, both traditionally pastoralist communities who raise cattle, sheep and goats and camels. Following them are the Pokomo, traditionally farmers. The county is generally dry and prone to drought. Rainfall is erratic, with rainy seasons in March–May and October–December. Conflicts have occurred between farmers and other people over access to water. Flooding is also a regular problem, caused by heavy rainfall in upstream areas of the Tana River.

A recent survey prepared by ALMRP, Tana River District presented to the Tana River District Steering Group (2004) found that the county is 79% food insecure and with an incidence of poverty at 62% (Interim Poverty Strategy Paper (I-PSP), 2000–2003, Kenya).

=== Religion ===
Religion in Tana River County

Religion (2019 Census)	Number
Islam	256,422
Protestant	22,866
Catholicism	11,306
Other Christian	11,148
Evangelical Churches	6,791
African Instituted Churches	4,015
No Religion / Atheists	1,044
Other	453
Traditionists	226
Orthodox	176
Hindu	115
Don't Know	80
Not Stated	68

== 2012 ethnic violence ==
On 22 August 2012, in the worst violent incident in Kenya since 2007, at least 52 people were killed in ethnic violence in Tana River County between the Orma and Pokomo communities residing in Tana River County.

== Villages and settlements ==
- Ariti
- Balguda
- Bangale, Kenya
- Baomo
- Baomo
- Borobini
- Bohoni
- Bongonoko
- Chathoro
- Chewani
- Chiffiri
- Laini
- Fitina
- Furaha
- Handarako
- Idsowe
- Ingile
- Irangi
- Wacha Kone
- Wenje
- Maziwa
- Ngao, Kenya
- Wema

Bura Irrigation and Settlement Project is located in Tana River County. During the years 1981-1988 about 2,200 families from different parts of Kenya were settled in this irrigation scheme.

Tana River County consists of forest, woodland and grassland which are minor centers of endemism. The forests are designated National Reserve status if they have >4 plant endemics and >7 vertebrate endemics (IUCN, 2003). Despite the apparent adequate natural resources, the region remains marginalized from the rest of the country. Efforts at development always seem to center on the huge River Tana, despite massive failures in all the previous irrigation projects in the district, i.e. Bura, Hola and the Tana delta rice irrigation project which failed after the water works were damaged by the El Niño rains in 1998. Other economic activities in Tana River county include mining with gems such as Iron ore, Uranium, Gypsum, Barite and illmenite.

== See also ==
- 2014 Lamu attacks
