= Kipini =

Historic Swahili settlement in Kenya

- Location within Kenya
- Coordinates: 2.526°S 40.529°E
- Country: Kenya
- Province: Coast Province
- Time zone: UTC+3 (EAT)

Kipini is a historic Swahili settlement in Kenya's Coast Province. Its located at the mouth of the Tana River. The main tribes inhabiting the town includes the Waswahili, Wapokomo, Wabajuni, Orma, and other Kenyans

== See also ==
- Historic Swahili settlements
- Swahili architecture
