= Hola, Kenya =

- Town
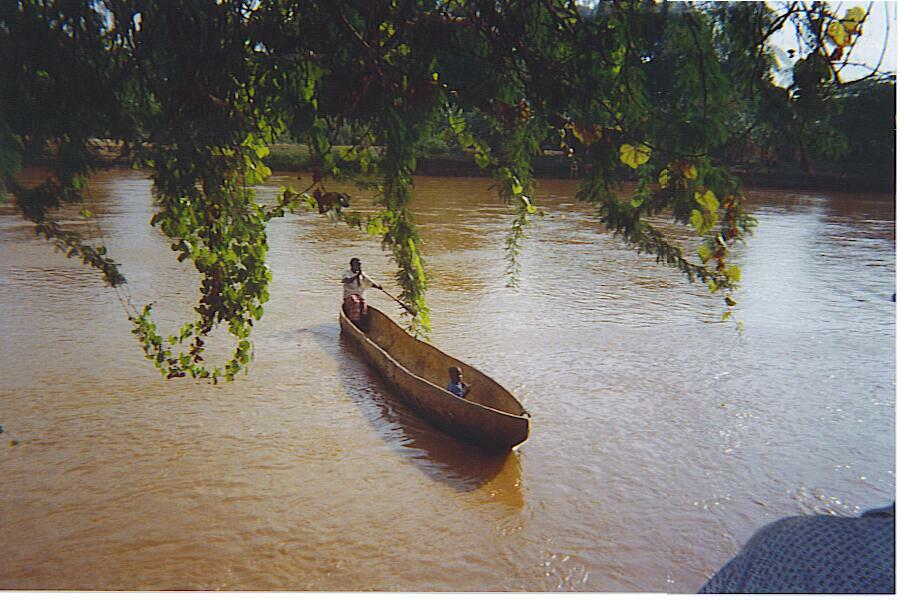
- Tana River ferry

- Location in Kenya
- Coordinates: 1°40′S 40°02′E
- Country: Kenya
- Province: Coast Province
- County: Tana River County

Population (1999)
  - Total: 6,932
- Time zone: UTC+3 (EAT)

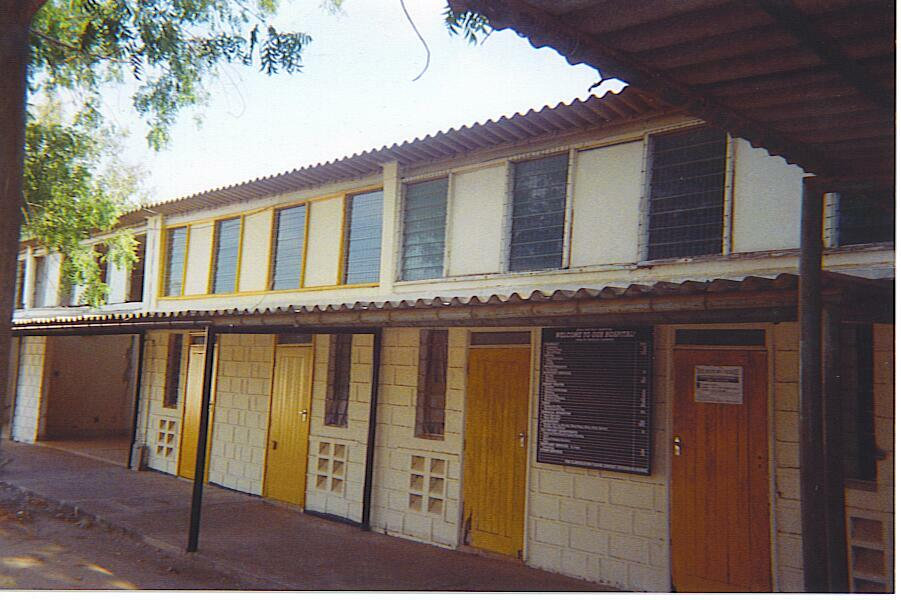
District Hospital, Hola

Hola, also known as Galole, is a small town in Kenya on the Tana River with a population of 6,932. Hola is the capital of the Tana River County. It is a busy market town and a portal to Garissa County and the former North Eastern Province by local canoe ferry across the Tana River.

In addition to the Hola agricultural irrigation scheme, there is a District Hospital and a Kenya Prisons facility located within the town. After the 2013 election, which brought in devolution, based on the 2010 constitution, the town become the headquarters of the Tana River County. the office of the governor is located in Hola town. the county has three constituencies, Bura, Galole and Garsen. the county has a number of elected officials namely Governor, senator, women representative, deputy governor and three members of parliament. The county also has 15 ward representatives.

== History ==
Hola was the site of a detention camp, the location of the Hola massacre in 1959. Eleven Mau Mau detainees were clubbed to death by prison wardens employed by the British. The victims were Mau Mau rebels being held in the camp as part of Operation Anvil. After the Hola massacre the name 'Hola' was changed to Galole by the colonial government so that this episode would be forgotten. In 1971, in a bid to revive African history, the then President Jomo Kenyatta ordered that Galole revert to its original name. Kenyatta gave this order after he met with a large delegation from Tana River. Since then, Galole is again known as Hola.
