= Lamu Port and Lamu–Southern Sudan–Ethiopia Transport Corridor =

Transport and infrastructure project in Kenya

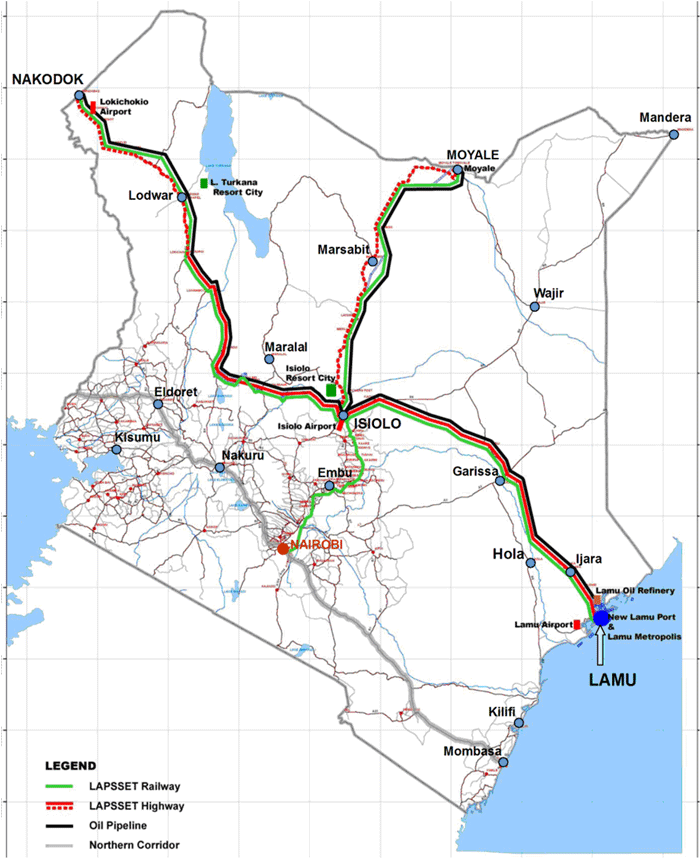
Map showing the scope of the LAPSSET Project within Kenya

The Lamu Port-South Sudan-Ethiopia-Transport (LAPSSET) Corridor project, also known as Lamu corridor, is a transport and infrastructure project in Kenya that, when complete, will be the country's second transport corridor. Kenya's other transport corridor is the Northern Corridor, which links Mombasa to Uganda, passing through Nairobi and much of the Northern Rift. Some basic LAPSSET infrastructure has been built (a police station and harbor office in Lamu and lengthening of the Lamu airport runway). The construction of LAPSSET's main components (ports, pipelines, roads, railways) is currently ongoing with construction of the first berth at Lamu Port completed in October 2019. Although the project is not formally stalled, its short to medium term goals are uncertain. Insecurity and political instability in Kenya are mostly to blame, as is the consideration of more commercially viable alternative pipeline options through Tanzania or Ethiopia. The low oil prices since 2015 also affect LAPSSET's commercial prospects.

As of 2025, insurgent attacks by the militant group Al-Shabaab (based out of Somalia) have stalled the project.

== Background ==
The aim of the project is to cut over-dependence on Kenya's main port of Mombasa as well as to open up Kenya's largely under-developed northern frontier through the creation of a second transport corridor.

Key towns in the project are Lamu and Isiolo in Kenya, Juba in South Sudan and Addis Ababa in Ethiopia.

The project was initially conceived in 1975 but never took off due to various reasons. The project was later revived and included in Kenya Vision 2030. In 2009, the cost of LAPSSET was estimated at US$16 billion. Estimates from 2015 put the cost of the project at between US$22 billion and US$23 billion. On 1 April 2013, Kenya's government announced the setting up of a government agency, the LAPSSET Corridor Development Authority (LCDA) to manage the project on behalf of the Kenyan government. The cost of the project was put at KSh.2.5 trillion/= (US$29.24 billion).

The timeline of the project is not clear, including when it started and when it will be completed. Some projects like the Isiolo-Merille projects began in 2007. It was estimated that, at the peak of the project between 2013 and 2018, the Kenyan government would spend about 6% of the country's Gross Domestic Product or 16% of its annual budget on the project. The project is in turn expected to contribute an additional 3% increase in Kenya's GDP by 2020.

== LAPSSET Corridor projects ==
The LAPSSET Corridor includes the following infrastructure projects:

- Lamu Port at Manda Bay (23 Berths including associated infrastructure)
- Standard gauge railway line from Lamu – Isiolo – South Sudan (Juba) – Ethiopia (Addis Ababa)
- Highways from Lamu – Isiolo – South Sudan (Juba) – Ethiopia (Addis Ababa)
- Crude oil pipeline from Lamu – Isiolo – Nakodok/Nadapal (South Sudan), and Product Oil Pipeline from Isiolo – Moyale – Addis Ababa (Ethiopia)
- International airports at Lamu, Isiolo, and Turkana (Lokichogio);
- Resort cities at Lamu, Isiolo and Lake Turkana
- Oil refinery at Isiolo.
- Services related infrastructure project components, namely;
  - a. Malindi – Garsen road
  - b. High Grand Falls multipurpose dam
    - i. Water supply
    - ii. Power supply; and
  - c. Fibre optic cable / communication
  - d. Other generated and attracted investments in commercial and manufacturing sectors along the LAPSSET Corridor.

In addition to this the project is also spearheading the development of associated infrastructure sub projects, in particular the High Grand Falls Power Station that is envisaged to produce 500MW of power and provide water to Lamu city, Lamu Port and metropolis, and irrigation of mega farms planned for the Tana Delta among other areas within the Corridor. The High Grand Falls will be used to create a manmade lake at its dam with a view to controlling perennial flooding within the lower Tana Basin. More importantly, the LAPSSET Corridor infrastructure is being developed as a critical enabler meant to spur growth of other sectors of the economy within the Corridor. Of great significance is the rich agricultural value chain, spanning over ten different economic crops whose implementation has begun with the establishment of mega irrigation schemes.

== Institutionalisation of the project ==
The LAPSSET Corridor Project is the first single integrative infrastructure Project the Government has initiated and prepared under Vision 2030 Strategy Framework without external assistance.

Kenya is spearheading the development of the LAPSSET Corridor to strengthen the country's position as a gateway and a transport and logistics hub to the East African sub-region and the Great Lakes region to facilitate trade, promote regional economic integration and interconnectivity between African countries. The project is managed by the LAPSSET Corridor Development Authority (LCDA), which reports to the Presidency.

=== Mandate of LAPSSET Corridor Development Authority ===
In March 2013, the LAPSSET Corridor Development Authority (LCDA) was established through the Presidential Order Kenya Gazette Supplement No. 51, Legal Notice No. 58, The LAPSSET Corridor Development Authority Order 2013 to plan, coordinate and manage the implementation of the Lamu Port-South Sudan-Ethiopia Transport Corridor Project. A director general heads the 11 member board that includes five state officials, private sector representatives and a chairman appointed by the president. The LCDA will push for public private partnerships to help in implementation of the project. The Authority is reporting to the Presidency in accordance with the Constitution of Kenya. The LCDA is headed by Mr. Silvester Kasuku, MBS, CMILT, Director General/ Chief Executive Officer and Amb, Dr. Francis Muthaura, EGH, chairman of the Board of the Authority. The functions of the LCDA are as follows:

- i. Plan, coordinate and sequence LAPSSET Corridor projects in collaboration with implementing ministries and agencies;
- ii. Coordinate implementation of LAPSSET Corridor projects across implementing ministries and agencies;
- iii. Provide leadership, direction and guidance in operations and implementation of the LAPSSET Corridor;
- iv. Ensure implementation of all decisions and resolutions of the government;
- v. Mobilize funds to project components using a variety of resources including budgetary resources from government, donor loans, infrastructure bonds and private finance;
- vi. In collaboration with National and County government department, build the capacity of LAPSSET Corridor towns to manage urban growth resulting from LAPSSET Corridor investments;
- vii. Promote the competitiveness and use of the LAPSSET Corridor for the transport of goods and people; and
- viii. Provide a forum for all stakeholders of the LAPSSET Corridor.

The LCDA is the policy, implementation, operational coordination and technical oversight organ for the LAPSSET Corridor Project. The LCDA has inter-ministerial coordination committees composed of relevant ministries.

== Economic viability of LAPSSET program ==
Project studies that were completed in 2011 on the LAPSSET Corridor project components showed great economic viability with most of the project components registering High Economic Internal Rates of Return of between 17% and 23.4% compared to acceptable industry minimum standard of 10% for infrastructure projects as shown in Table 1 below.

Table 1: LAPSSET Corridor Project Components with accompanying cost implications

No	Item	Quantity	Cost (US$) millions	EIRR %
1	Lamu port	23 berths	3,095	23.4
2	Railway	1,710 km	7,099	17.8
3	Highway	880 km	1,398	12.9
4	Crude Oil Pipeline	2,240 km	3,949	21.6
5	Product Oil Refinery	120,000bpd	2,800	13.9
6	Resort Cities	3 Lots	1,214	20.8
7	Airports	3 Lots	506	20.7

Services

No	Item	Quantity	Cost (US$) millions	Cost (KSh./=) trillions
1	High Grand Falls (Hydro + Water)	1 Lot	2,110
2	Associated Infrastructure		2,500
	Total cost		24,524	2,403

Note 1: Both all and each project components are judged as viable in view of national economy as EIRRs computed are more than 12%, which is opportunity cost.

Note 2: Cargoes are generated by the Corridor itself. Higher figures than the above table can be realized.

From the statistics provided, it is therefore evident that if the government structured the projects into bankable bundles, it would attract private sector investors to participate and invest in the projects.

=== Funding ===
The Lamu port construction project is currently being funded by the Government of Kenya using domestic tax revenue.

The Development Bank of South Africa had offered to fund construction of Lamu–Garissa–Isiolo Road to the tune of KSh.126 billion/= (US$1.5 billion).

=== Cost of LAPSSET program ===
The seven key infrastructure project components of the LAPSSET Corridor Program require substantial amounts of resources, with a budget estimate of US$24.5 billion, equivalent to KSh.2 trillion at current exchange rates, in construction costs. It is estimated that Lamu Port, with its 23 berths alone, will cost approximately US$3.1 billion, the Railway US$7.1 billion, while the crude oil pipeline will cost a further estimate of US$3 billion for the Lamu to Lokichar trunk line alone.

Indeed, the figures indicated above are no mean task and cannot be left to the Government's limited resources alone. The Government has prioritized the participation of the private sector in the development of LAPSSET Corridor infrastructure through infrastructure bonds and equity participation, among other money market instruments. There is already significant private sector interest being registered towards the implementation of these project components; hence, the need has arisen for the government to structure and package bankable projects that are investor-ready for uptake by the private sector.

In January 2024, Kenya Railways Corporation estimated that development of the railway projects would cost the government at least Ksh2.4 trillion (US$16 billion).

== Status of implementation of LAPSSET Corridor projects ==
The government undertook groundbreaking for the LAPSSET Corridor Program at the Lamu Port site on 2 March 2012. Afterward, it commenced construction activities for various infrastructural facilities and services aimed at progressing the implementation of the LAPSSET Corridor Project. The ongoing construction works for various project activities are summarized below.

=== Lamu Port ===
Construction activities for various facilities at the Lamu Port site are ongoing, with progress for the Lamu Port Building and Port Police and security facilities having achieved a completion rate of 95%.

- Port Building: 95% complete.
- Police Station: 95% complete.
- Design review ongoing for the first three berths, with construction to begin in July 2014
- The physical development plan and survey for the port area has been completed.

The Government has so far allocated KSh.4.2 billion in preparation for the commencement of construction works for the first three berths. The government is also in the process of mobilising more resources from its own revenue resources as well as from private sector investors through equity and debt including bonds while mobilisation of more funds through equity and debt participation by investors for the construction of the first three berths and its associated infrastructure. These three berths are being constructed by China Communications Construction Company at a cost of nearly $480 million, and will reportedly be opened by 2020.

Lamu Port is expected to consist of 23 berths when complete, will cost US$3.5 billion and be 400 ha (1,000 acres) in size. The port will be a deep water port at 18 m depth.

From bids requested by the Kenyan Government, the first phase of the port will include 3 deepwater berths with a capability of handling ships with a deadweight capacity of up to 100,000 tonnes. The port will be built at Manda Bay and is expected to be operational starting December 2012.

A consortium of companies led by China Communications Construction Company (CCCC) was reported to have won the bid for construction of the first three berths at Lamu port. The cost of the project is valued at KES 41 billion (US$484 million). CCCC is associated with China Road and Bridge Corporation (CRBC), which has historically secured many road construction and other tenders in Kenya.

The port started in 2021. In 2024 it had cargo volume of 74,380 tonnes, but this increased in 2025 to 799,161 tonnes. In 2026, the port received more big ships due to the 2026 Strait of Hormuz crisis. The port is transitioning to a Public Limited Liability Company.

=== Standard gauge railway line to Juba ===
A railway line will run from Lamu to Juba, a distance of 1,720 km (1,070 mi), and will be capable of handling trains with speeds of up to 160 km/h (99 mph) for passenger trains, and perhaps 120 km/h (75 mph) for freight trains. This will be at an estimated cost of $7.1 billion and is to be completed by 2015.

By 2030, the railway line is expected to handle 30 daily trains to Juba and 52 to Addis Ababa.

In January 2024, Kenya Railways Corporation estimated that development of the railway projects would cost the government at least Ksh2.4 trillion (US$16 billion). The link from Lamu to Isiolo will cost Ksh523.05 billion (US$3.49 billion), while the link from Isiolo to Moyale will cost Ksh476.7 billion (US$3.178 billion). Connecting Isiolo to Nairobi will cost Ksh358.8 billion (US$2.392 billion) and the connection between Lamu and Mariakani will cost Ksh385.95 billion (US$2.573 billion).

=== Highway component ===
The LAPSSET road projects will run from Lamu to Isiolo and onwards to Juba and Addis Ababa through Moyale. The road from Lamu will pass through Hola and Bura to Garissa. From Garissa, the main branch will run to Isiolo, while a second branch will run off to Mwingi and Matuu for the exploitation of coal in the Kitui Basin. Isiolo will be linked to Nairobi through one route, to Nakodok near Lokichogio via another, and to Moyale via the third route. Southern Sudan will be in charge of constructing a route from Nakodok to Juba, while Ethiopia will construct a road from Moyale to Addis Ababa. The planned two-lane highway will cost US$1.4 billion.

The LAPSSET highway component has been categorized in sections as indicated below:

- Lamu–Garissa (D568) 250 km
- Garissa–Isiolo (C81,D586,B9) 423 km
- Isiolo–Moyale (A2) 505 km
- Isiolo–Nadapal 721 km

==== Isiolo – Moyale Road ====
Construction and upgrading of the 136 km (85 mi) Isiolo – Merille road commenced in 2007 and the road was finished in 2011. The road was upgraded into a two-lane tarmac road. Construction of the Marsabit – Turbi road, also part of LAPSSET, commenced 29 August 2011, with an expected delivery date of 4 April 2014.

Significant progress has been made on this highway component, particularly the 505 km Isiolo-Moyale A2 Road costing approximately KSh.46 billion/= and being funded jointly by the African Development Bank, European Union and the Government of Kenya.

The 136 km Isiolo – Merille River Road constitutes the first section of the 505 km road from Isiolo to Moyale, which is part of the road linking Tunduma in Southern Tanzania with Addis Ababa in Ethiopia. The project construction works are complete. This project was funded by the African Development Bank at a cost of KSh.6,318,130,428/27.

The 121 km Merille River – Marsabit Road constitutes the second section of the road from Isiolo to Moyale and Addis Ababa in Ethiopia. The road begins at Merille River and runs in a northerly direction and terminates at Marsabit. The construction works for this section has progressed at 10% having commenced in January 2013 and is scheduled for completion by January 2016 and is being funded by the European Union. The project will cost a total sum of KSh.13.73 billion/=.

The third section (123 km) begins in Marsabit at the junction with the road C82 and runs in a northerly direction and terminates in Turbi. The construction works for this section has progressed to 47.4% having commenced in April 2011 and is being funded by the African Development Bank and is expected to be completed by March 2014. The project will cost a total sum of KSh.13 billion/=.

Construction works for the fourth section, the Turbi – Moyale Road, have progressed to 11.5% completion, having commenced in October 2012 for a period of 36 months. This section is being funded by the African Development Bank and is expected to be completed in December 2015.

==== Moyale – Addis Ababa Road ====
Construction of the 193 km Ageremariam-Yabelo-Mega has already begun.

==== Other roads ====
In addition to the above, the governments of Kenya and South Sudan working together with the World Bank, recently completed feasibility studies and detailed engineering designs for the Lokichar – Nadapal – Torit – Juba Road. Construction will begin oncefinances are mobilised.

Furthermore, the Government of Kenya is currently considering mechanisms for participation by private sector investors to deliver the Lokichar - Isiolo - Garissa - Lamu Road and Lamu - Garsen Road through Engineering, Procurement, and Construct (EPC). Construction of the road would provide immediate road connection between Lamu Port and Juba and Addis Ababa.

The designs for the 623 km Kitale – Lodwar – Nadapal Road are 95% complete, while the Garsen – Lamu Road (115 km) awaits mobilization of resources for construction.

=== Crude oil pipeline ===
Continued discovery of oil resources within the region have led to the planning of pipelines within the LAPSSET framework. A crude oil pipeline will link Lamu Port to Kenya's oil fields in the Turkana Basin as well as Ugandan and South Sudanese oil fields.

The pipeline is expected to cost $4 billion. Construction was originally expected to begin by end of 2013 once feasibility studies contracted to German company ILF were complete.

=== Airports ===
The government has embarked on improving facilities at the three airports to provide for air travel services in the interim to enhance accessibility to the corridor. Improvement works on Lokichogio Airport were completed in the recent past and is already operational with scheduled flights landing at the airport.

Provision of airport facilities will strengthen buildup of air transport and logistics services along the corridor in readiness for the construction of the three international airports at the three locations in the future.

Kenya Civil Aviation Authority has already made plans to establish air transport safety, security and surveillance facilities and services to strengthen air transport and logistics in northern Kenya.

==== Manda Lamu Airport ====
The government recently completed lengthening of Lamu Manda Island Airport runway from 1.1 km to 2.3 km. Improvement works are already complete for the airport terminal building. Preparations are at an advanced stage towards the construction of a parallel taxiway and aircraft apron area to improve capacity of the airport. These improvements will enhance the capacity of Manda Lamu Airport that already has a strong scheduled flights clientele.

==== Isiolo Airport ====
The Government has completed construction works on the 1.2 km Isiolo Airport runway. Construction works are currently ongoing for Airport Terminal Building which is scheduled for completion by end of 2014. Kenya Airports Authority has made plans to operationalise the airport once facilities are in place by mid 2014.

=== Resort cities ===
The three proposed resort cities at Lamu, Isiolo and Lokichogio on the shores of Lake Turkana are estimated to cost $1.2 billion.

The Isiolo resort city is to be established under a public private partnership at a cost of KSh.18.9 billion/=. In 2012, the Isiolo County Council was asked to set 2,600 ha (6,500 acres) of land aside for establishment of the resort city. The site is located at Kipsing Gap, 20 km (12 mi) west of Isiolo town.

The site was identified by Japanese Port Consultants after a nine-month feasibility study. The consultants also developed a conceptual design for the resort city with more than 10 preliminary models of the city. The plans include rules on land usage and guidance on private sector and local community involvement. The plans also cater for growth and development of the city for the next 20 to 30 years.

Under Kenya's new constitution, it will be mandatory for the government to get consent from the locals before commencing with the project. Residents will be compensated for the acquisition. The local council will then acquire the land title and make money from leasing out the land and charging rates.

The Isiolo resort will be situated between Katim hill and Oldonyo Degishu hill. Neighbouring game parks and national reserves include Lewa Wildlife Conservancy in the south, Buffalo Springs and Shaba National Reserve to the North, Samburu Game Reserve and Ewaso Ng'iro River to the West. The area also boasts a wide variety of plants and animals, including the big five, leading to it also being known as the Jewel in the crown.

Kipsing Gap was picked in preference of Kulamawe and Archers Post due to security, accessibility, cultural diversity, natural diversity, wildlife, water availability, electricity, sewer system among other factors.

In January 2012, 32 councillors led by chairman Adan Ali and Town Clerk Morris Ogolla and legislators, professionals, women group leaders were briefed by government officials on the importance of the resort city.

Attractions will include three star to six star hotels, a local art and craft museum, theatres, conference centres and cultural events.

=== Oil refinery ===
A proposed oil refinery in Lamu will cost $2.5 billion and is expected to refine 120,000 barrels of oil a day.

=== Electric power supply ===
The Kenyan government has prioritised the provision of appropriate infrastructural service aimed at supporting the massive investments planned for the LAPSSET Corridor. The government has just completed the electric power connection for the Lamu Port of 220 kV transmission line from Rabai through Malindi and Garsen to Lamu.

Construction of electric power transmission line has commenced to deliver electric power connection to key LAPSSET Corridor areas such as Garissa, Isiolo and Turkana. Already construction of 132 kV transmission line from Seven Folks/Kindaruma to Garissa is ongoing; construction of 132 kV transmission line from Mount Kenya region to Isiolo is ongoing. Plans for the construction of 400 kV transmission line from Lake Turkana to Suswa are at an advanced stage while plans are ongoing for the construction of 220 kV line from Garsen to Garissa.

- Rabai – Lamu 220 kV Transmission Line completed
- Garsen 220 kV Transmission Line to commence soon
- Lake Turkana – Suswa 400 kV Transmission Line to commence
- Lamu – Garissa – Isiolo – Lokichar 220 kV Transmission Line planned
- Kindaruma – Garissa 132 kV Transmission line to complete construction by Dec 2014
- Masinga – Isiolo 132 kV Transmission line to complete construction by Dec 2014
- Kamburu – Isiolo 220 kV Transmission Line to complete Construction by Dec 2014

=== Provision of social infrastructure, services and security ===
In addition to the ongoing physical works along the LAPSSET Corridor, the Kenyan government has commenced a comprehensive plan for the provision of social infrastructure and services. This initiative is aimed at ensuring that schools, health centres, towns, water and sanitation services, security services and other social amenities are provided at an optimal level to make LAPSSET Corridor areas a secure, desirable, liveable and working environment.

== Recent developments in the LAPSSET Corridor project area ==
Since conclusion of the LAPSSET study, oil discoveries have been made in the Turkana area in Kenya with current recoverable crude oil reserves estimated at 600 million barrels.

With these developments, the original plan and design for the crude oil pipeline has to be reviewed to accommodate these new discoveries. The pipeline will now evacuate crude oil from Lokichar Oil fields in Kenya, Lake Albert Oil fields in Uganda and oil fields in South Sudan. As such considerations are being made to commence construction of crude oil pipeline from Lokichar to Lamu Port to evacuate Kenyan oil as more preparations are made to complete negotiations on the construction of joining crude oil pipelines from Uganda and South Sudan oil fields.

In this event, the Lokichar to Lamu crude oil pipelines will be the trunk crude pipeline to accommodate crude oil from Uganda and South Sudan. Crude oil terminal tank farms will therefore be built at Lokichar and Lamu to manage the logistics of pumping crude oil through the pipeline as well as into the loading into ships for export. As a result, the governments of South Sudan and Kenya are preparing for the admission of the Uganda Crude Oil Pipeline component into the LAPSSET Corridor Crude Oil Pipeline Project.

As a way forward, the tripartite Heads of State Infrastructure Summit held in Uganda on 20 February 2014, agreed to allow Kenya to proceed with the Expression of interest for the development of the crude oil pipeline between Lamu and Lokichar oil fields to evacuate Kenyan oil as well as prepare for the construction of connecting lines from South Sudan's and Ugandan Oil fields.

In order to support the development of the crude oil pipeline, the Government has identified the need to simultaneously construct the Lamu-Lokichar Road alongside the pipeline. As an early delivery strategy, the Ministries of Energy and Petroleum as well as Transport and Infrastructure have adopted an integrated approach for the development of the crude oil pipeline and the road from Lamu-Lokichar.

== Participating countries ==
Participating countries include:

- Kenya
- South Sudan
- Ethiopia
- Uganda

== Criticism ==
The LAPSSET Corridor project has come under criticism for its social and environmental impacts. The civil society organisation "Save Lamu" has raised concerns regarding insufficient involvement of local communities, as well as land right and negative environmental impacts. Affected pastoralists in Turkana County have complained about a lack of consultation. In Lamu, a petition by local fishermen furthermore criticised the project of violating their right to adequate information. Affected people living on community land, in particular pastoralists, have raised concern about violation of land rights in association with the LAPSSET. This includes fears expressed by pastoralist communities over land speculations, and subsequent dispossession and marginalisation. Pastoralists are furthermore threatened by a disruption of seasonal grazing routes caused by the construction of the highway that is part of the LAPSSET project. Environmental hazards have been listed as an issue of concern for local communities, especially in terms of environmental degradation in the context of oil exploration and transport.

== See also ==
- Railway stations in Kenya
- Railway stations in South Sudan
- Railway stations in Ethiopia
- Railway stations in Djibouti
