= Liboi =

Liboi Liboy
- Town
- Location in Kenya.
- Coordinates: 00°21′20″N 40°52′32″E
- Country: Kenya
- County: Garissa County

Population (2009 Census)
  - Total: 11,440
- Time zone: UTC+3 (EAT)

Liboi (Somali: Liboy) is a town in Garissa County, Kenya, at the border with Somalia.

== Location ==
The town is located approximately 180 kilometres (112 mi), by road, north-east of Garissa, the location of the county headquarters. Liboi is located about 78 kilometres (48 mi) east of Dadaab. This is approximately 546 kilometres (339 mi), by road, northeast of Nairobi, the capital and largest city in Kenya. Liboi is also about 15 kilometers west of the border with Somalia, and 17 kilometers west of the Somali town of Dhobley. The coordinates of Liboi are: 00°21'20.0"N, 40°52'32.0"E (0.355557°N 40.875549°E).

== Overview ==
Liboi is an administrative location in Liboi Division, one of eleven administrative divisions of the Garissa County. Liboi has a total population of 11,440 as of 2009. Electorally Liboi is a ward and part of Dadaab Constituency. Liboi Airport, which lies within the town, serves Liboi and neighboring communities.

== History ==
On 6 September 1940, Liboi was the site of fighting during World War II between Allied forces under British command and Italian colonial forces. The Italians secured a victory in this war. This was the first engagement of the war involving South African troops.

In the early 1990s, at the beginning of the Somali Civil War, Liboi was the site of a major refugee camp. In 1992, 50,000 Somalis were living near Liboi.
