= Transport in Kenya =

Transport in Kenya refers to the transportation structure in Kenya. The country has an extensive network of paved and unpaved roads.

Kenya's railway system links the nation's ports and major cities and connects Kenya with neighbouring Uganda. There are 15 airports with paved runways.

A map of Kenya showing main roads as of 2013.

== Roads ==
According to the Kenya Roads Board, Kenya has 160,886 kilometres (99,970 mi) of roads.

=== Classification ===
They are currently classified into the following categories:

Class	Description	Purpose	Roads	Paved	Unpaved	Total (in km)
A	International Trunk Roads	Link centres of international importance and cross international boundaries or terminate at international ports or airports.	A1, A2, A3, A4, A14, A23, A104, A109	2,772	816	3,588
B	National Trunk Roads	Link nationally important centres (e.g. Provincial headquarters).	B1, B3, B7, B8	1,489	1,156	2,645
C	Primary Roads	Link provincially important centres to each other or to higher class roads (e.g. District headquarters).	C107, C111, C115	2,693	5,164	7,857
D	Secondary Roads	Link locally important centres to each other, or to more important centres or to a higher class road (e.g. divisional headquarters).		1,238	9,483	10,721
E	Minor Roads	Any link to a minor centre.		577	26,071	26,649
SPR	Special Purpose Roads	Government Roads (G); Settlement Roads (L); Rural Access Roads (R); Sugar Roads (S); Tea Roads (T); Wheat Roads (W)		100	10,376	10,476
U	Unclassified Roads	All other public roads and streets		2,318	96,623	98,941
All	Total	All public roads and streets		11,187	149,689	160,876

=== Bus transport ===
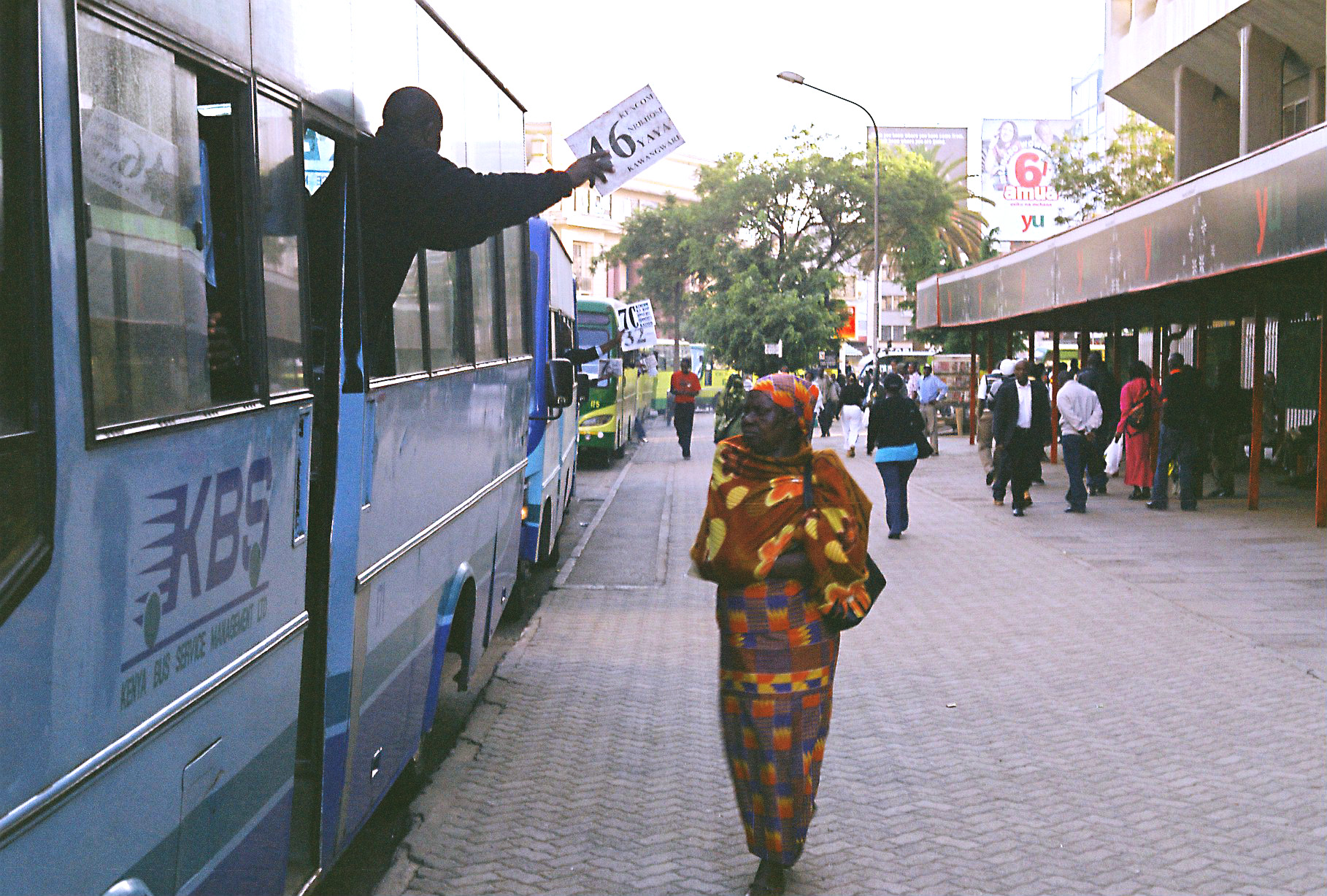
Kenya Bus Services, Nairobi.

There are around 100,000 matatus (minibuses), which constitute the bulk of the country's public transport system.

Once the largest bus company in Kenya, Kenya Bus Services, ran into financial difficulties, forcing them to reduce the number of buses operated. They are currently operating minibuses within Nairobi city, although new, smaller, city buses offering passengers higher standards of comfort and safety have been introduced on some inner-city routes.

Coast Bus, the oldest bus operator in Kenya, runs a day and night service between Nairobi and the coastal city of Mombasa. Ascott operates minivans offering shuttle service between Nairobi and Kisii; they offer snacks on board. The Guardian bus co. Ltd, a private company which runs the Guardian Bus service, operates day and night passenger bus and courier services to a number of destinations in Western Kenya.

Other bus companies in Kenya include Modern Coast, Nyamira Express, Otange, MASH, Vanga, Simba coach, Xenon dreamline, Messina, MAslah, Amani coaches, west coaches, Horizon, 2nk sacco, Chania Comfort, chania genesis, parrot line, x calibur and Crown Bus but there are a number of other companies which offer inter-city services such as Eldoret Express, Kawere, Climax, Greenline, Western Express, Mbukinya, Kalita Coaches and Palmdam.There also number of shuttle companies operating van to western Kenya such as Sasaline, Blueline, Classic, Khukhu, Royal Rift, Transline msafiri, Transline classic, Premium shuttles, Nyanza shuttle, North Rift, Molo Line and Mash Poa.Taxedo

=== Regulation and Enforcement ===
In February 2004 the Ministry of Transport in Kenya introduced new regulations governing the operation of Matatus. These regulations (famously referred to as "Michuki Rules") include: the compulsory fitting of safety belts and speed governors. In addition, standing on matatus was banned. As a result of these regulations, many matatus were taken off the road, which caused great disruption to public transport, forcing many people to walk to work. Now the situation has stabilised, and the new regulations have resulted in a great reduction of the number of people killed and injured in accidents. Due to lax enforcement after the initial push, the number of deaths in road accidents had increased in recent years.

On 1 December 2012 the government began to enforce the recently amended traffic act which has significantly increased the penalties for offences. Matatu operators have protested the move through strike action.

=== International highways ===
Two routes in the Trans-African Highway network pass through Kenya and the capital, Nairobi:

- The Cairo-Cape Town Highway, Trans-African Highway 4, linking North Africa, East Africa and Southern Africa. From Nairobi southwards this is one of the most heavily used routes in the network, and includes one of the longest complete paved sections. However, it still has missing links to the north and it is not practical to travel to Cairo without off-road vehicles. This part will be completed as part of the LAPSSET project.
- The Lagos-Mombasa Highway, Trans-African Highway 8, links East Africa and West Africa. It is only complete between the Ugandan–DR Congo border and Mombasa, linking the African Great Lakes region to the sea. It is also named the 'Trans-African Highway'.

== Airports ==
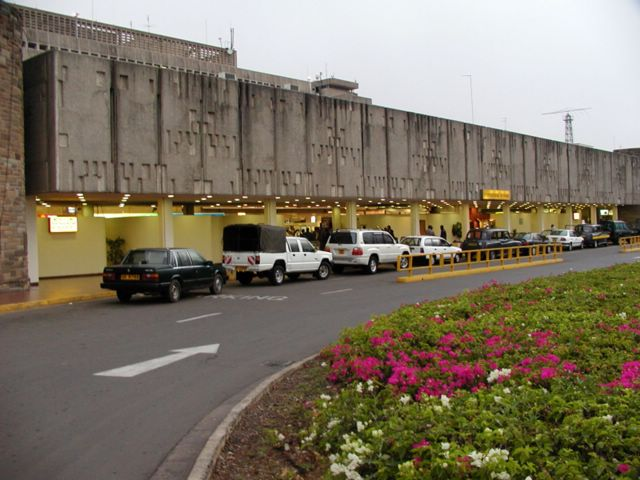
Jomo Kenyatta International Airport, located in Nairobi

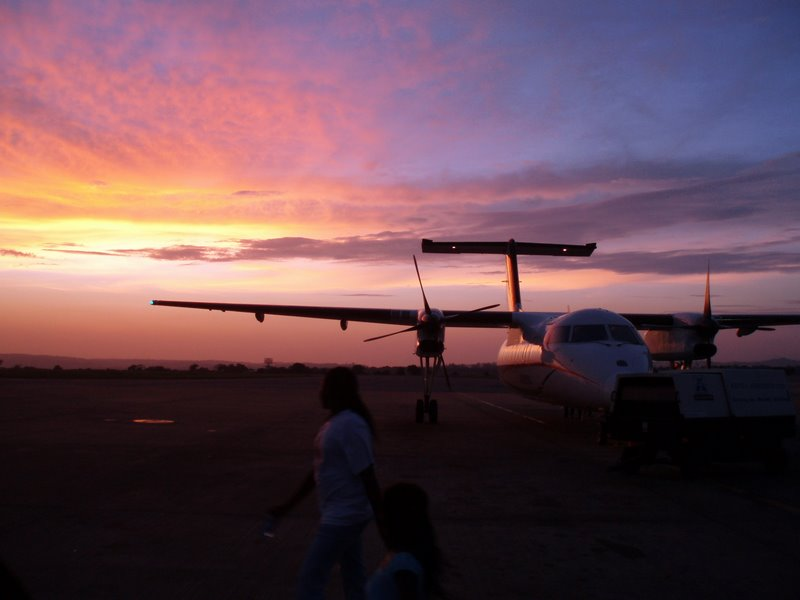
Sunset at Moi International Airport, Mombasa

=== Airports – with paved runways ===
total: 16

over 3,047 m: 5

2,438 to 3,047 m: 2

1,524 to 2,437 m: 2

914 to 1,523 m: 6

under 914 m: 1 (2013)

Jomo Kenyatta International Airport in Nairobi, is Kenya's largest airport and serves the most destinations. Some international flights go to Moi International Airport in Mombasa. Kisumu Airport was upgraded to an international airport in 2011 and a second phase of expansion is under way. In 2012, US Navy Seebees built a major new tarmac runway at Wajir Airport that can take heavy aircraft.

=== Airports – with unpaved runways ===
total: 181

1,524 to 2,437 m: 14

914 to 1,523 m: 107

under 914 m: 60 (2013)

Many airports with unpaved runways serve private purposes, such as private game parks and safari lodges, but are still serviced by airlines like AirKenya

== Railways ==
Total: 2,066 km (1,284 mi)

1,000 mm (3 ft 3 3/8 in) metre gauge: 2,066 km

The former Uganda Railway, was run by the company East African Railways. It jointly served the present countries of Uganda, Tanzania and Kenya. Since the dissolution of the EAR corporation in 1977, the national company Kenya Railways Corporation runs the former Uganda Railway and its branches in Kenya. The most important line in the country runs between the port of Mombasa and Nairobi, sleeping car accommodation is offered for tourists.

In 2006, the Rift Valley Railways Consortium led by South African companies took over the operation of the Kenyan and Ugandan railway network on a contract lasting 25 years, with the opportunity of renewal. After criticism from the Kenya Railways Corporation, RVR doubled the frequency of service, and also imposed restrictions to reduce train derailments caused by the ageing infrastructure.

RVR run passenger trains within Kenya only, primarily from Nairobi to Mombasa but also to local towns such as Kisumu. Passenger services on these lines are offered on peak periods only. Freight services are the bulk of RVR's operations.

In 2008, agreements were made with Uganda about gauge standardisation.

In 2011, Kenya signed a memorandum of understanding with the China Road and Bridge Corporation to build the Mombasa–Nairobi Standard Gauge Railway (SGR). Financing for the US$3.6 billion project was finalised in May 2014, with the Exim Bank of China extending a loan for 90% of the project cost, and the remaining 10% coming from the Kenyan government. Passenger service on the SGR was inaugurated on 31 May 2017. Work to extend the SGR to Suswa is complete. The SGR program is intended to replace the old, inefficient metre-gauge railway system.

The first segment of the SGR, between Mombasa and Nairobi, opened passenger rail service in June 2017, and freight rail service in January 2018.

=== Railway links with adjacent countries ===
African Great Lakes

- South Sudan – none – proposed link to Juba (2005) break-of-gauge 1,000 mm (3 ft 3 3/8 in)/1,067 mm (3 ft 6 in)
- Tanzania – same 1,000 mm (3 ft 3 3/8 in) gauge – maybe defunct
- Uganda – yes – same gauge – 1,000 mm (3 ft 3 3/8 in)

== Waterways ==
Part of the Lake Victoria system is within the boundaries of Kenya. Kenya has a major international port at Mombasa, serving both Kenya and Uganda. Kisumu on Lake Victoria is also another major port, which has ferry connections to Uganda and Tanzania.

=== Merchant Marine ===
Total: 3 ships (with a volume of 1,000 gross tonnage (GT) or over) 6,049 GT/7,082 tonnes deadweight (DWT)

By type: passenger/cargo 2, petroleum tanker 1

Registered in other countries: 6 (2006)

=== Ports and harbours ===
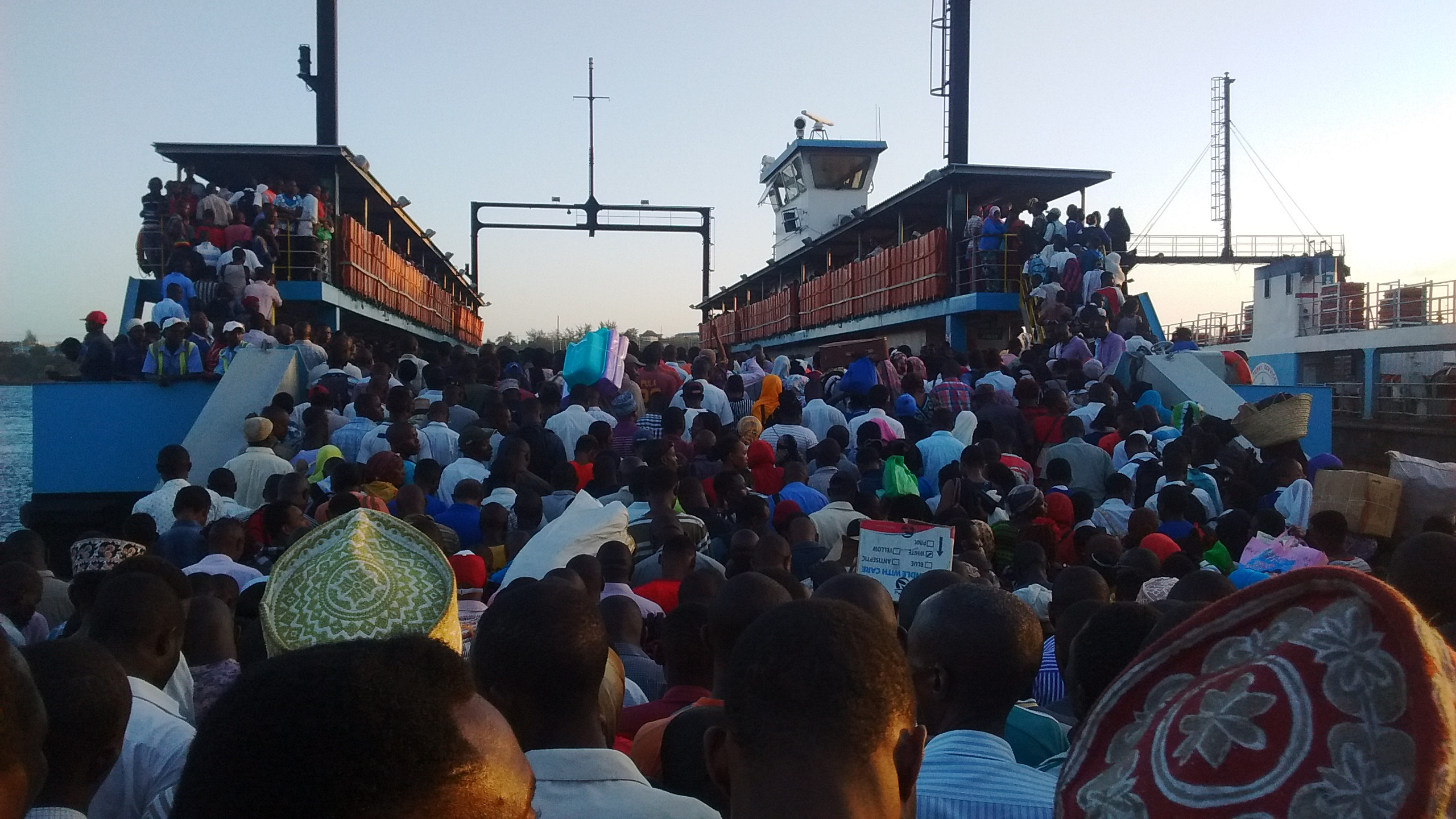
Overloaded ferry in Mombasa

Mombasa has the only commercial port that reaches international standards. Mombasa's commercial port is called Kilindini Harbour and is run by the Kenya Ports Authority, it lies on the Indian Ocean.

There are plans to build another international port in Lamu to the north east of Mombasa.

There is an inland port at Kisumu which serves Lake Victoria. In 2015 a new ferry was delivered to Kisumu by road.

== See also ==
- East African Railway Master Plan
- Lake Victoria ferries
- Matatu
