= List of roads in Kenya =

The following is a list of the national roads in Kenya, under the jurisdiction of the Kenya National Highway Authority (KeNHA). KenHa classifies International Trunk Roads as Class ‘A’ and National Trunk Roads as Class ‘B’. The list is not exhaustive.

== National roads ==
List of National Roads In Kenya
Number	Name of Road	Distance	Designated	Completed
1	Arusha (Tanzania)–Holili (Tanzania)–Taveta–Voi Road	230 kilometres (143 mi)	2014	2018 (Expected)
2	Suam–Eldoret Road	75 kilometres (47 mi)	2017 (Expected)	2020 (Expected)
3	Malindi–Bagamoyo (Tanzania) Highway	460 kilometres (286 mi).	2017(Expected)	2020 (Expected)
4	Elwak–Mandera Road	216 kilometres (134 mi)	2016 (Expected)	2019 (Expected)
5	Dongo Kundu Bypass Highway	17.5 kilometres (11 mi)	2015	2018 (Expected)
6	Isebania–Kisii–Ahero Road	172 kilometres (107 mi)	2016 (Expected)	2019(Expected)
7	Kisumu–Kakamega–Webuye–Kitale Road	160 kilometres (99 mi)	2015	2021(Expected)
8	Mariakani–Kaloleni–Mavueni Road	60 kilometres (37 mi)	2006	2016
9	Garissa–Nuno–Modogashe–Wajir Road	320 kilometres (200 mi)	2015	2017
10	Garsen–Witu–Lamu Highway	122 kilometres (76 mi)	2016	2018
11	Mombasa–Garissa Road	463 kilometres (288 mi)		
12	Nairobi–Mombasa Road	482 kilometres (300 mi)		
13	Nairobi–Malaba Road	448 kilometres (278 mi)		

== See also ==
- Transport in Kenya
