= List of dams and reservoirs in Kenya =

The following is a partial list of dams in Kenya.

During Kenya's colonial era, the word "dam" referred to both the structure as well as the reservoir or lake impounded by it.

- Gitaru Reservoir
- Kamburu Dam
- Kiambere Reservoir
- Kindaruma Reservoir
- Masinga Reservoir
- Koromojo Dam
- Masinga Dam
- Mukurumudzi Dam
- Nairobi Dam
- Ruiru Dam
- Rukenya Dam
- Sasamua Dam
- Thika Dam
- Chebara Dam
- Karimenu Dam
- Turkwel Dam
- Thwake Dam
- Sanawa Dam
