= Karura Hydroelectric Power Station =

Planned hydroelectric power station in Kenya

- Location of Karura Hydroelectric Power Station
- Country: Kenya
- Location: Karura, Embu County
- Coordinates: 00°46′57″S 37°53′20″E
- Status: Proposed
- Commission date: 2025 (exp.)
- Owner: Kenya Electricity Generating Company
- Operator: Kenya Electricity Generating Company

Power generation
- Nameplate capacity: 90 MW

Karura Hydroelectric Power Station, commonly referred to as Karura Power Station, also Karura Dam, is a planned 90 MW hydropower station in Kenya.

== Location ==
The power station would be located across River Tana, in Embu County, sandwiched between Kindaruma Hydroelectric Power Station upstream and Kiambere Hydroelectric Power Station downstream. Karura Power Station, is about 15 kilometres (9 mi) downstream of Kindaruma Power Station. This location is approximately 190 kilometres (118 mi), by road, north-east of Nairobi, the capital and largest city of Kenya.

== Overview ==
The power station is a run of river, hydropower installation, with capacity of 90 Megawatts. The design calls for the waters of River Tana to be diverted through a "dug-out channel" and then delivered to the power-generation site, thereby reducing the "displacement of communities". Kenya Electricity Generating Company (KenGen), a company, owned 70 percent by the government of Kenya, is the developer and owner of this power station.

The development, decided upon circa 2012, is being developed to stabilize the national electricity grid with increased hydro-power, in view of the increased intermittent sources in the country's energy mix, including solar and wind. Feasibility and ESIA studies were conducted in the 2009 to 2012 time-frame. Karura and Mutonga were two locations that were identified as potential sites for hydro-power station development.

== Construction timeline ==
As of February 2018, the development was entering the tendering process, after which the construction cost and timeline would be determined.

As of January 2020, the dam was in its early planning stage, and was expected to be operational by 2025.

== See also ==
- Africa Dams
- Kenya Power Stations
