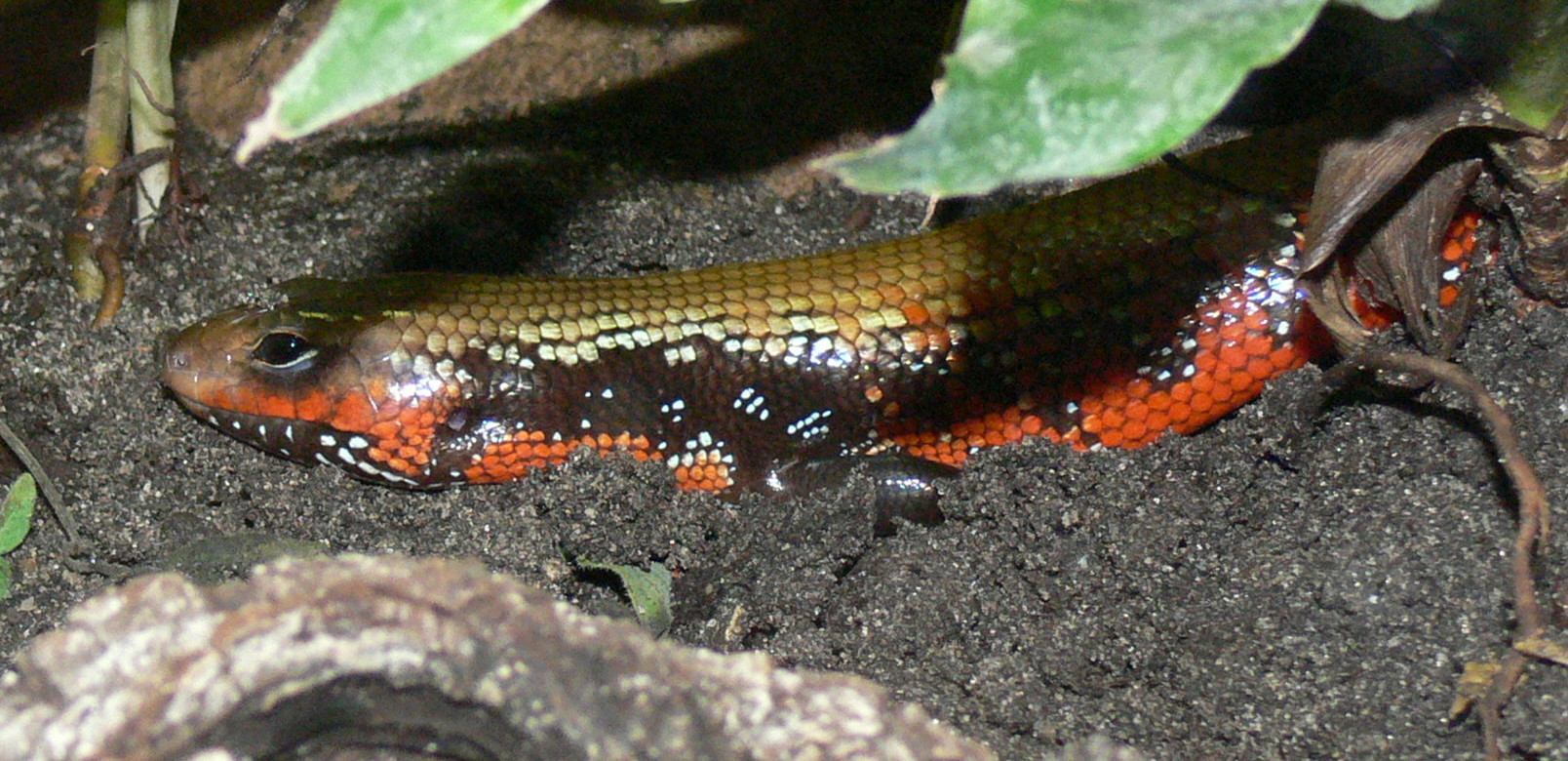

Conservation status
- Least Concern (IUCN 3.1)

Scientific classification
- Kingdom: Animalia
- Phylum: Chordata
- Class: Reptilia
- Order: Squamata
- Family: Scincidae
- Genus: Lepidothyris
- Species: L. fernandi

Binomial name
- Lepidothyris fernandi (Burton, 1836)

Synonyms
- Tiliqua fernandi Burton, 1836; Lygosoma fernandi — Boulenger; Lepidothyris fernandi — Cope, 1892; Lygosoma fernandi — Bocage, 1895; Riopa fernandi — Loveridge, 1936; Mochlus fernandi — Mittleman, 1952; Lepidothyris fernandi — Wagner et al., 2009; Mochlus fernandi — Freitas et al., 2019

= Fire skink =

Species of lizard

The fire skink (Lepidothyris fernandi), also known commonly as Fernand's skink, the Togo fire skink, and the true fire skink, is a fairly large skink, a species of lizard in the family Scincidae. The species is known for its bright and vivid coloration. Native to tropical forests in West and Central Africa, the fire skink lives 15 to 20 years. This species is a diurnal lizard that burrows and hides. It is relatively shy and reclusive, but may become tame in captivity.

== Etymology ==
The specific name, fernandi, refers to the island formerly known as Fernando Po, which has been called Bioko since 1979. It is known in the Yoruba language, spoken in Western Africa, as Oloronto.

== Taxonomy ==
Historically, the fire skink has been placed in several different genera and was until recently placed in Riopa together with several skinks from southeast Asia. While these are superficially similar to the African fire skink, they are closer to some other Asian skinks, resulting in their move to Mochlus. The fire skink is not closely related to other skinks and belongs to the genus Mochlus. However, a review of the taxonomy of the fire skink did reveal that it, as traditionally defined, actually consists of three separate species. This essentially limits true M. fernandi to tropical West Africa and westernmost Central Africa, while population in Central and East Africa are M. hinkeli and M. striatus.

== Distribution ==
Mochlus fernandi occurs in the humid forest zone of southern West and Central Africa, from Guinea and Sierra Leone to Gabon and the Democratic Republic of the Congo.

== Subspecies ==
Two subspecies are recognized as being valid, including the nominotypical subspecies:

- Mochlus fernandi fernandi (Burton, 1836) – western Central Africa and Nigeria
- Mochlus fernandi harlani (Hallowell, 1845) – West Africa

Nota bene: A trinomial authority in parentheses indicates that the subspecies was originally described in a genus other than Mochlus.

== Description ==
The fire skink is a fairly large species of skink, reaching up to 37 cm (15 in) in total length (including tail). The most notable aspect of the fire skink's appearance is its vivid, bright colors. Smooth, gold scales adorn the fire skink's back, while red and black bars set against a silver background line its sides. The fire skink does not display obvious sexual dimorphism, which makes it difficult to sex. Males are, in general, bulkier than females with a slightly flatter head and wider jaws.

== Reproduction ==
The fire skink is oviparous. An adult female will generally lay a clutch of five to nine eggs after mating. Fire skink eggs take forty to fifty days to hatch when incubated at a temperature of 85 °F (29 °C).

== Diet ==
M. fernandi has a large appetite, and it is mainly insectivorous. Insects such as crickets, and larvae such as mealworms, are used for feeding captive specimens.

== In captivity ==
The fire skink is kept as a pet. Many specimens available for sale are wild-caught, but captive-bred skinks are available. The fire skink requires a larger tank with plenty of horizontal space, as well as some vertical space for its occasional tendency to climb. A 40 U.S. gallons (150 liters) aquarium is suitable for one adult. The fire skink is not social and should be kept alone. It also requires a loose substrate for burrowing. The environment should be moist and humid, with plenty of ground cover to create hiding places. One end of the tank should be warmed with a lamp for basking. Live insects are a proper diet, and some keepers provide an occasional pinkie mouse.
