= Thika (disambiguation) =

Thika is a town in Kenya.

Thika may also refer to:

- Thika District, Kenya, of which the town is the capital
- Thika River, Kenya
  - Thika Dam
- Thika Road, connecting the town to Nairobi
- Empire Minnow, a tug sold in 1948 and renamed Thika
