= Renewable energy in Kenya =

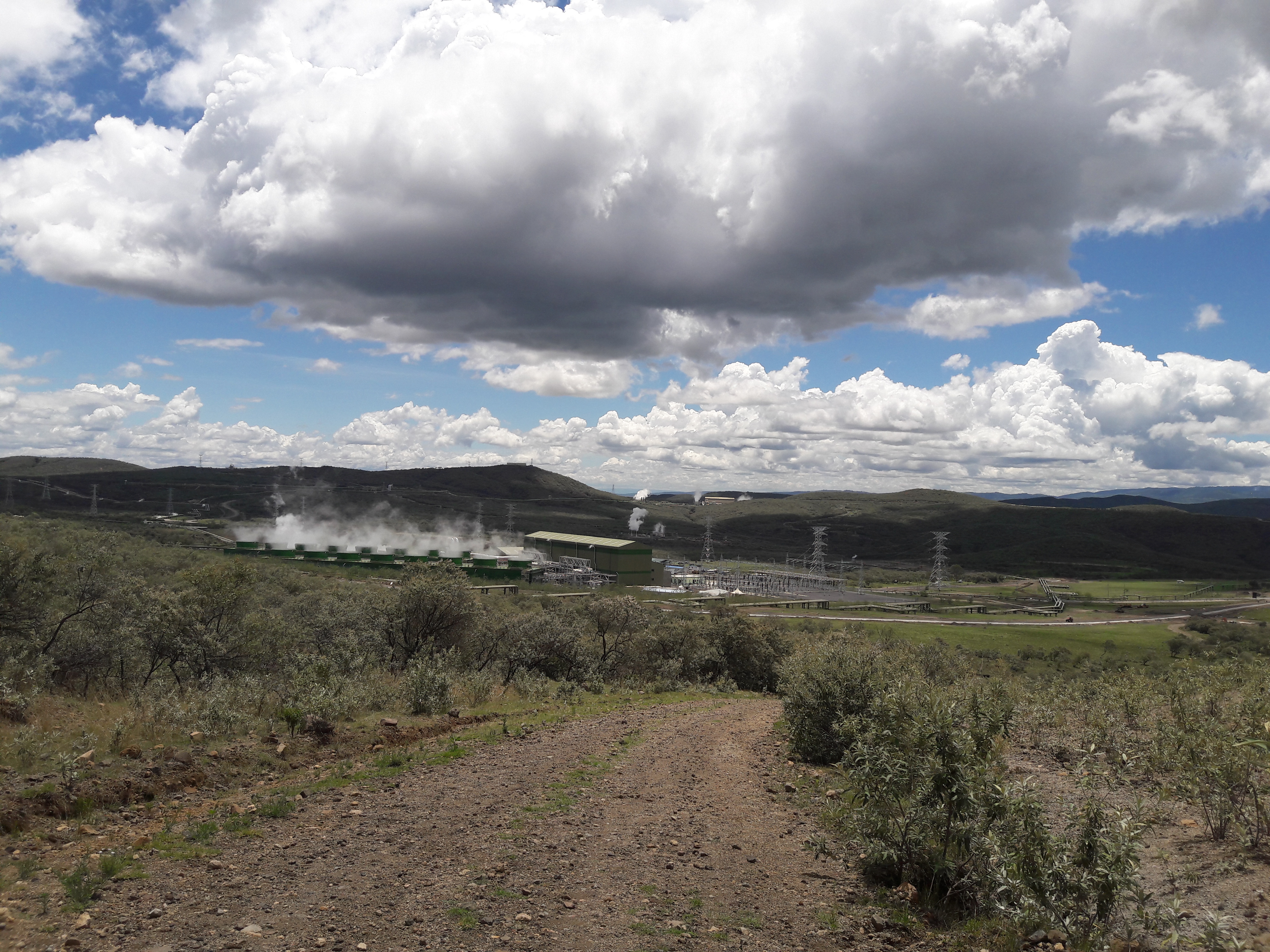
Olkaria V Geothermal Power Station

Most of Kenya's electricity is generated by renewable energy sources. Access to reliable, affordable, and sustainable energy is one of the 17 main goals of the United Nations' Sustainable Development Goals. Development of the energy sector is also critical to help Kenya achieve the goals in Kenya Vision 2030 to become a newly industrializing, middle-income country. With an installed power capacity of 2,819 MW, Kenya currently generates 826 MW hydroelectric power, 828 geothermal power, 749 MW thermal power, 331 MW wind power, and the rest from solar and biomass sources. Kenya is the largest geothermal energy producer in Africa and also has the largest wind farm on the continent (Lake Turkana Wind Power Project). In March 2011, Kenya opened Africa's first carbon exchange to promote investments in renewable energy projects. Kenya has also been selected as a pilot country under the Scaling-Up Renewable Energy Programmes in Low Income Countries Programme to increase deployment of renewable energy solutions in low-income countries. Despite significant strides in renewable energy development, about a quarter of the Kenyan population still lacks access to electricity, necessitating policy changes to diversify the energy generation mix and promote public-private partnerships for financing renewable energy projects.

== Renewable energy sources ==
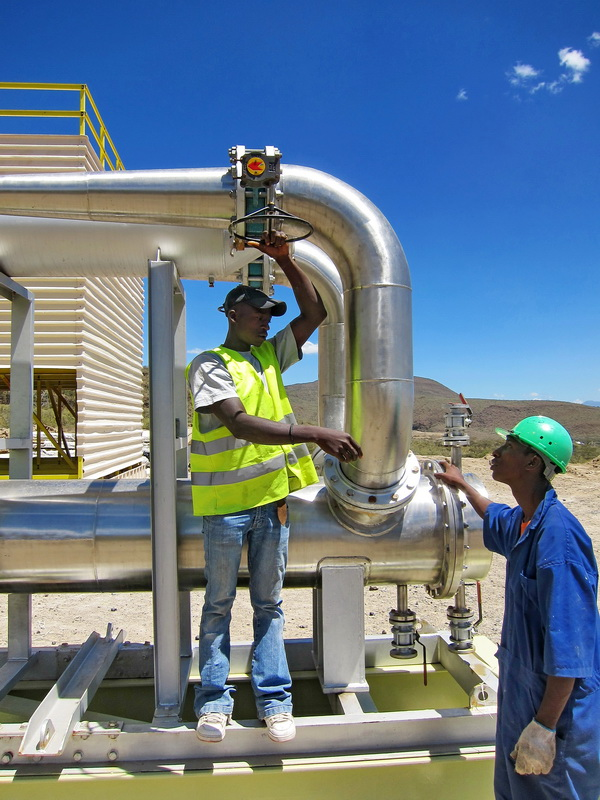
Worker at Olkaria Geothermal Plant

=== Geothermal ===
Kenya is the eighth largest geothermal power producer in the world and the largest geothermal producer in Africa. It was one of the first countries in Sub-Sahara Africa to exploit geothermal power on a significant scale. Exploration of geothermal resources in the Kenyan Rift Valley started in the 1950s and gained momentum in the 1960s. In 1970, the United Nations Development Programme and the Kenya Power and Lighting Company conducted geological explorations in the Kenya Rift and identified Olkaria as the best candidate for exploratory drilling. This led to the construction of the Olkaria Geothermal Power Station, the first geothermal power plant in Africa. With over 300 wells sunk to date, Kenya derives nearly half of its energy (47%) from geothermal plants, a proportion greater than any other nation. However, the high costs and high risks of field development pose significant barriers for private sector financing. Lack of technical expertise and poor governance structures also limit the development of geothermal energy. Recently, environmentalists have been critical of extracting energy at Hell's Gate, a national park that has been designated as a UNESCO World Heritage site. This warrants further considerations for the local wildlife and underground water supply when drilling steam walls for geothermal energy.

The Geothermal Development Company (GDC), a semi-autonomous government agency, is tasked with developing steam fields and selling geothermal steam for electricity generation to Kenya Electricity Generating Company (KenGen) and Independent Power Producers. The Geothermal Development Company drilled 59 wells in the Olkaria I to Olkaria IV projects between 2009 - 2010. The Rift Valley has an estimated geothermal potential of 15,000 MW using today's technology.

=== Hydropower ===
Hydropower accounts for 36% of Kenya's renewable energy mix. Much of the hydroelectric power of Kenya is derived from the Tana River. The Seven Forks Hydro Stations are five stations situated along the lower part of the Tana River: Masinga Power Station, Gitaru Power Station, Kamburu Power Station, Kindaruma Power Station, and the Kiambere Power Station. Several small hydropower plants have also been established as stand-alone systems for supplying power to remote areas. Although the Kenyan government has historically relied on hydropower for electricity generation, climate change has impacted the reliance on hydropower by influencing patterns of rainfall and temperature, leadings to periods of floods and droughts. The Kenyan government is strongly pushing for a shift to other alternative sources of electricity generation. By 2030, hydropower will only account for 5% of total capacity. Considerations also have to be taken to not endanger access to clean drinking water when expanding the energy system.

=== Wind power ===
Since the beginning of the 19th century, wind energy has been used for domestic water pumping and irrigation in Kenya. To accelerate the development of wind power, Kenya has reformed its legal and institutional frameworks through low feed-in tariffs, energy auctions, and net metering. Recently, Kenya launched the Lake Turkana Wind Power Project, the largest wind power project in Africa and Kenya's largest public-private investment in history. The wind farm consists of 365 turbines with the capacity to generate 310 MW to Kenya's national grid. However, the project has also been accused of infringing on the rights of Rendille, Samburu, and Turkana communities living on the concession land. Tensions ensue as villages wareforced to be relocated and residents struggle to secure employment with competition from all over the country. Moreover, because the communities surrounding the Marsabit County are not connected to the national grid, residents themselves will not receive the energy produced by the project. The neglect of local land rights has led to dthe isplacement of indigenous communities and a persistent energy demand gap that remains unaddressed.

=== Solar power ===
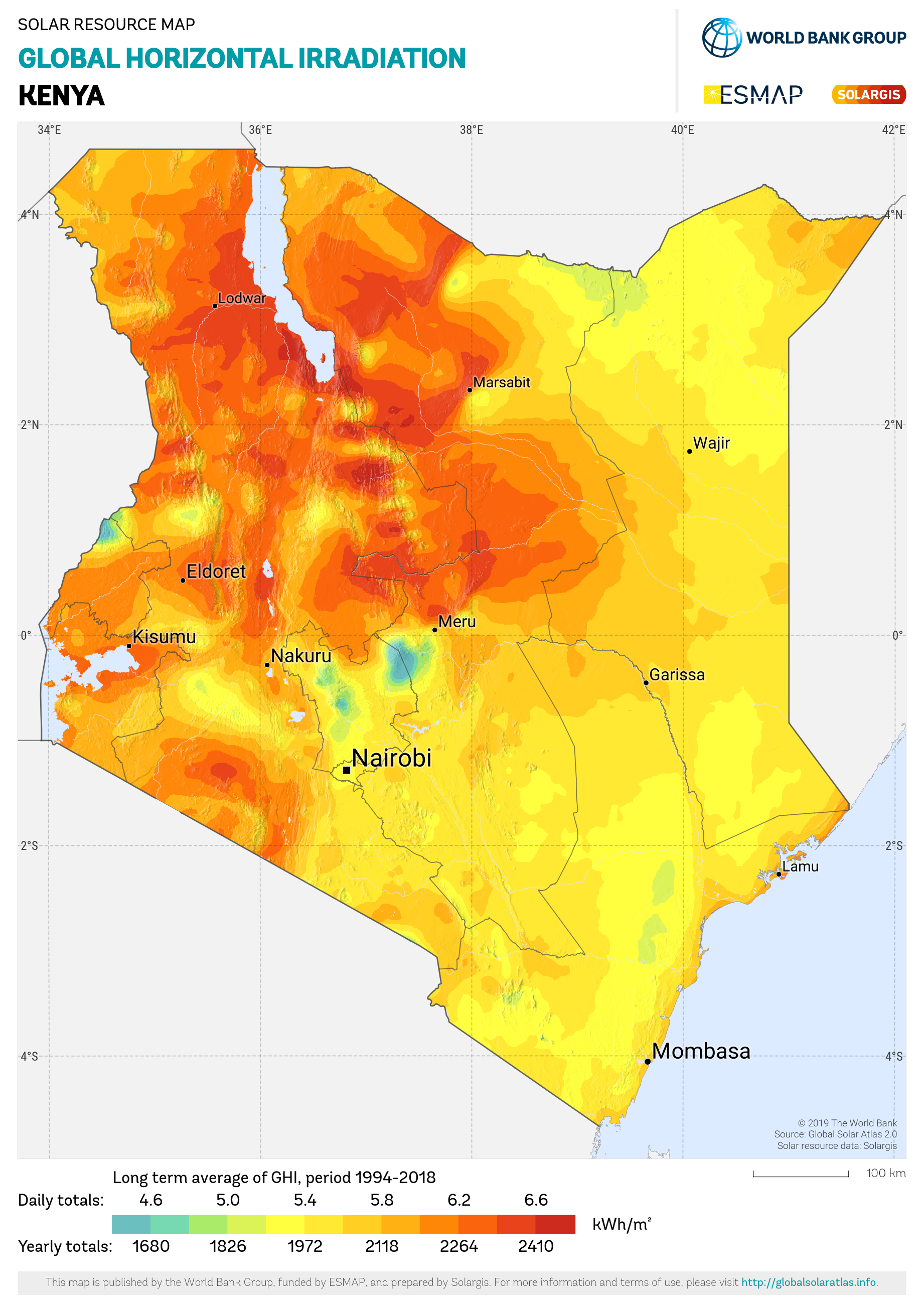
Solar potential of Kenya

Kenya has one of the highest household solar ownership rates in the world. More Kenyans are turning to solar power due to relatively high connectivity costs to the grid and the abundance of solar power in Kenya. Solar photovoltaic systems are particularly prevalent among rural households with limited access to grid electricity. They are sold to users in Kenya through a competitive free market network and are commonly used for solar water pumping, solar irrigation, and cold storage. More factories are installing solar panels on their rooftops to counter against the high cost and instability of grid electricity. Under the Value Added Tax (VAT) Act 2013, the VAT Amendment Act 2014, and the Finance Act 2018, the Kenyan government agreed to remove import duty and zero-rated VAT for renewable energy equipment and accessories.

To achieve the renewable energy goals set forth in "Vision 2030," the Kenyan government has launched several solar energy projects, of which the Garissa Solar Power Plant has substantially reduced energy costs in Kenya and has become the largest solar power plant in East and Central Africa. Several other solar power stations that are operational or under construction include: Rumuruti (40 MW), Radiant (40 MW), Eldosol (40 MW), Alten (40 MW), Kenyatta University (10 MW), Malindi (52 MW), and Kopere (50 MW). Companies such as M-Kopa offer pay-as-you-go plans to make solar power products more affordable and accessible to low-income households. Furthermore, the World Bank and International Finance Corporation (IFC) have partnered as part of a Lighting Africa initiative. Western companies have also helped sponsor efforts to introduce decentralized solar power solutions in the country. These efforts have made Kenya a global leader in the number of solar power systems installed per capita.

== Regulatory and economic policies ==
Beginning in the mid-1990s, Kenya embarked on a series of structural and regulatory reforms in its energy sector. The Electric Power Act of 1997 granted the Kenya Electricity Generating Company (KenGen) the responsibility of power generation and the Kenya Power and Lighting Company (KPLC) the responsibility for power transmission and distribution. The Act also established the Electricity Regulatory Board to determine consumer tariffs and promote competition. Later, the Energy Act of 2006 established the Energy Regulatory Commission as the single regulatory agency responsible for regulating the economic and technical aspects of the energy sector. Most recently, President Uhuru Kenyatta passed the Energy Act 2019 to consolidate laws relating to energy and establish the Energy and Petroleum Regulatory Authority in place of the Energy Regulatory Commission.

In 2008, the Kenyan government introduced feed-in tariffs (FIT) to attract private investments in electricity generation from renewable energy sources. The first iteration of this policy, however, was only limited to wind, hydropower, and biomass-generated electricity. In 2010, the policy was revised which added new tariffs for geothermal, solar, and biogas generated electricity. Under the FIT system, investors of renewable energy are granted investment security and market stability for supplying electricity into the national grid. Although FIT policies were adopted to diversify power sources, generate income, and reduce the emission of greenhouse gases, there has been a significant delay in the deployment of renewable energy projects due to the lack of technical expertise and the inefficiencies in policy implementation.

== Foreign investment ==
=== Power Africa ===
Kenya is a beneficiary of the Power Africa movement, a partnership with the United States Agency for International Development (USAID) to increase access to electricity in sub-Saharan Africa. The movement has supported various renewable energy projects in Kenya, including the Kipeto Wind Farm, the Garden City Mall Solar System, and the Lake Turkana Wind Power project. Through Power Africa, the United States has collaborated closely with Kenya's government ministries, energy utilities, private sector companies, and entrepreneurs to expand access to electricity across the country. Specifically, the Power Africa Off-Grid Project works with solar home systems and mini-grid companies to expand energy access to underserved communities and businesses. As land-related issues have traditionally been the biggest source of community grievances against development projects, discussions have been centered on community engagement to ensure transparency in the land acquisition process and foster mutually beneficial relationships between the developer and the community.

=== Green Climate Fund ===
Established in 2010, the Green Climate Fund is the world's largest climate fund that supports developing countries to reduce their greenhouse gas emissions and enhance their ability to respond to climate change. Kenya's economy is highly vulnerable to climate change due to its dependency on rainfed agriculture, tourism, and hydroelectric energy generation. Recently, Kenya has launched a five-year, multi-million project under the Green Climate Fund to tackle the effects of climate change on the local water supply and the country's national economy. Titled, "Towards Ending Drought Emergencies (TWENDE)," the project seeks to strengthen the existing institutional framework for climate response and enhance the resilience of the agriculture sector in Kenya's arid lands. Although these efforts to support climate mitigation and adaption are well-intentioned, concerns exist over whether Kenya has put in place adequate mechanisms to tap into the Green Climate Fund in its fight against climate change-related effects. Support from key stakeholders, including the national government and development partners, are needed to ensure proper implementation of community-driven projects in response to climate adaptation.

== Future targets ==
The official logo of Kenya Vision 2030

The development of new and renewable sources of energy is one of the key projects in Kenya Vision 2030, a program launched by the former late President Mwai Kibaki to transform Kenya into a newly industrializing, middle-income country. Over the past decade, Kenya has expanded its access to electricity from below 30% to over 75%. In line with Sustainable Development Goal 7, Kenya aims to achieve universal access to sustainable energy to all, double the global rate of energy efficiency, and double the global share of renewable energy mix by 2030. To do this, the Kenyan government launched the Kenya National Electrification Strategy in 2018 to provide off-grid options, mini-grids, and stand-alone solar systems to rural communities. In partnerships with the World Bank and other institutions, the project has supported government efforts to expand electricity access to Kenya's North and Northeastern counties through private-sector delivery of solar off-grid products. Similarly, the Kenyan government also launched the Investment Prospectus to attract investments in the country's energy sector. The prospectus is intended to help investors and financiers identify opportunities in power generation, transmission, distribution, and off-grid electrification to meet the expected supply as outlined in Kenya Vision 2030.

== Challenges ==
=== Energy poverty ===
Energy poverty is a persistent problem in Kenya, particularly in rural communities. Only 40 percent of Kenya's population has access to reliable electricity. Despite the government's effort to subsidize electricity connections, many households are located far from the national grid, where it would not be economically viable to extend electricity. In such cases, families often rely on firewood and charcoal to meet their basic energy requirements, which are unreliable and could lead to indoor air pollution. Studies have shown that the low electrification rates in rural communities correlate with lower educational levels and poorer life expectancy. Taken together, these findings highlight the importance of providing access to modern energy services to improve living standards. To address the issue of energy poverty, the Kenya National Electrification Strategy has used a geospatial planning tool to identify the least cost technology options and the associated investments required for providing affordable and reliable electricity to low income remote populations. In particular, pay-as-you-go photovoltaic systems have been quite successful in locations where grid extension is not viable. The main challenge is to achieve the scale needed for this delivery strategy to be financially sustainable.

=== Underexploited renewable energy potential ===
Another challenge with renewable energy in Kenya is that a substantial proportion of renewable energy resources are unexploited. Although the majority of Kenya's electricity power mix is derived from renewable sources, Kenya harnesses only about 30% of its hydropower sources, 4% of its geothermal resources, and a much smaller proportion of its wind and solar power potentials. The high dependence on imported oil and wood biomass exerts significant strain on the remaining forests and accelerates the process of land degradation. In addition, the demand for electricity is outstripping the installed generation capacity, and additional incentives are needed to attract private investors to invest in renewable energy projects in Kenya.

== See also ==
- Energy in Kenya
- List of countries by renewable electricity production
- Wind power in Kenya
- Geothermal power in Kenya
- Renewable energy by country
