= Lanza's writhing skink =

There are two species of skink named Lanza's writhing skink:

- Mochlus grandisonianus, found in Somalia
- Mochlus paedocarinatus, found in Somalia and Ethiopia
