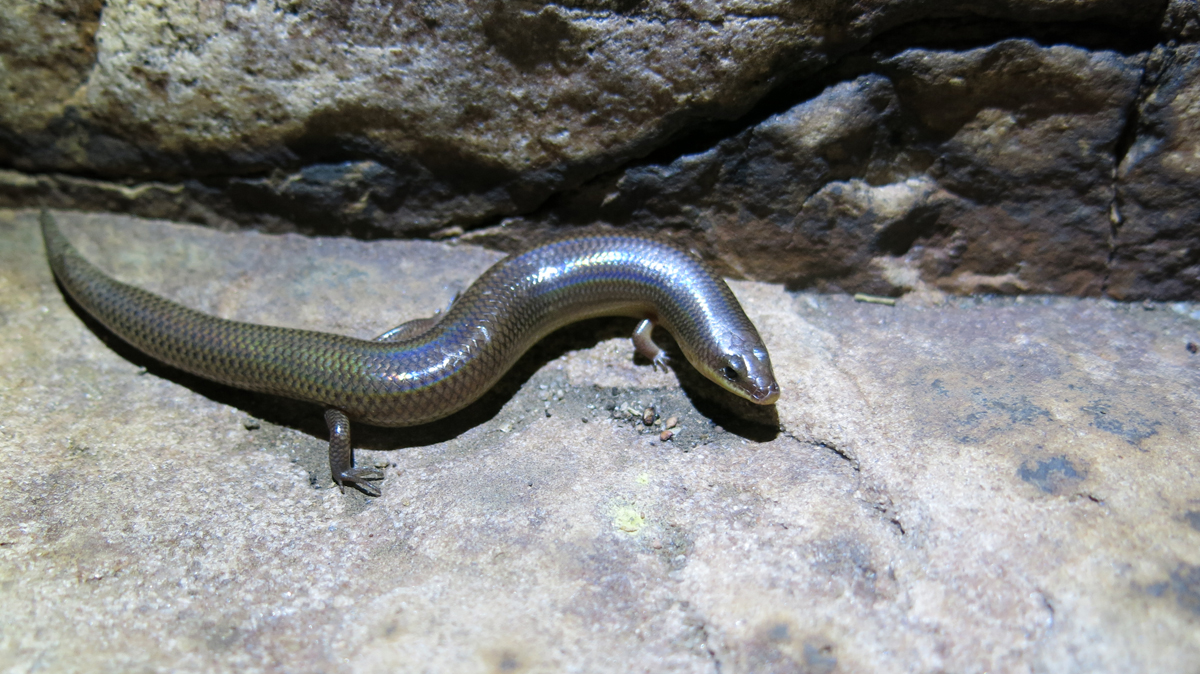
- Sundevall's writhing skink (Mochlus s. sundevallii ) in the Soutpansberg, South Africa.

Scientific classification
- Kingdom: Animalia
- Phylum: Chordata
- Class: Reptilia
- Order: Squamata
- Family: Scincidae
- Subfamily: Lygosominae
- Genus: Mochlus; Günther, 1864

= Mochlus =

Genus of lizards

Mochlus is a genus of lizards in the subfamily Lygosominae of the family Scincidae (skinks). The genus is endemic to Africa.

== Description ==
Skinks of the genus Mochlus are cylindrical in shape and robust. They get the common name "writhing skinks" from the side-to-side movement that they make when held in the hand.

== Diet ==
Skinks in the genus Mochlus feed on insects and millipedes.

== Species ==
The following 19 species are recognized as being valid.

- Mochlus brevicaudis (Greer, Grandison & Barbault, 1985)
- Mochlus fernandi (Burton, 1836) – fire skink
- Mochlus grandisonianus Lanza & Carfi, 1966 – Lanza's writhing skink
- Mochlus guineensis (W. Peters, 1879) – Guinean forest skink
- Mochlus hinkeli Wagner, Böhme, Pauwels & Schmitz, 2009 – Hinkel's red-sided skink, Hinkel's red-flanked skink
- Mochlus laeviceps (W. Peters, 1874) – common writhing skink
- Mochlus lanceolatus Broadley, 1990 – Broadley's writhing skink
- Mochlus mabuiiformis (Loveridge, 1935) – Mabuya-like writhing skink
- Mochlus mafianus (Broadley, 1994) – mafia writhing skink
- Mochlus mocquardi (Chabanaud, 1917) – Mocquard's writhing skink
- Mochlus paedocarinatus Lanza & Carfi, 1968 – Lanza's writhing skink, Abyssinian writhing skink
- Mochlus pembanus Boettger, 1913 – Pemba Island writhing skink
- Mochlus productus (Boulenger, 1909) – Boulenger's writhing skink
- Mochlus simonettai (Lanza, 1979) – Simonetta's writhing skink
- Mochlus somalicus (Parker, 1942) – Somali writhing skink
- Mochlus striatus (Hallowell, 1854)
- Mochlus sundevallii (A. Smith, 1849) – Sundevall's writhing skink
- Mochlus tanae (Loveridge, 1935) – Loveridge's writhing skink, Tana River writhing skink
- Mochlus vinciguerrae (Parker, 1932) – Vinciguerra's writhing skink

Nota bene: A binomial authority in parentheses indicates that the species was originally described in a genus other than Mochlus.
