= Mochlus tanae =

Conservation status
- Least Concern (IUCN 3.1)

Scientific classification
- Kingdom: Animalia
- Phylum: Chordata
- Class: Reptilia
- Order: Squamata
- Family: Scincidae
- Genus: Mochlus
- Species: M. tanae

Binomial name
- Mochlus tanae (Loveridge, 1935)

Synonyms
- Riopa tanae Loveridge, 1935; Lygosoma tanae — Lanza, 1990; Mochlus tanae — Spawls et al., 2018

Species of lizard

Mochlus tanae, also known commonly as Loveridge's writhing skink or the Tana River writhing skink, is a species of lizard in the family Scincidae. The species is native to East Africa.

== Etymology ==
The specific name, tanae refers to the Tana River of Kenya.

== Geographic range ==
M. tanae is found in Kenya, Somalia, and Tanzania.

== Reproduction ==
M. tanae is viviparous.
