= Mukuru =

Mukuru may refer to:

== Culture and language ==
- Mukuru (deity), a Supreme Creator (God) of the Himba and Herero people of Namibia
- Mukuru language, or Menchum, a Grassfields languages of Cameroon

== Places ==
- Mukuru kwa Njenga, a residential area of Nairobi, Kenya
- Mukuru slums, an informal settlement in Nairobi City, Kenya
- Mukurumudzi Dam, a dam in Mombasa, Kenya

== Other uses ==
- Mukuru Mighty Wanderers Football Club, a Malawian football club based in Blantyre
