= Mochlus simonettai =

Conservation status
- Data Deficient (IUCN 3.1)

Scientific classification
- Kingdom: Animalia
- Phylum: Chordata
- Class: Reptilia
- Order: Squamata
- Family: Scincidae
- Genus: Mochlus
- Species: M. simonettai

Binomial name
- Mochlus simonettai (Lanza, 1979)

Synonyms
- Lygodactylus simonettai Lanza, 1979

Species of lizard

Mochlus simonettai, also known as Simonetta's writhing skink, is a species of skink, a lizard in the family Scincidae. The species is endemic to Somalia.

== Etymology ==
The specific name, simonettai, is in honor of Italian zoologist Albert Mario Simonetta (born 1930).

== Geographic range ==
M. simonettai is found in Afgooye District, Somalia.

== Description ==
M. simonettai may attain a snout-to-vent length (SVL) of about 9 cm (3.5 in), with a tail slightly shorter than SVL.
