= Mochlus vinciguerrae =

Conservation status
- Least Concern (IUCN 3.1)

Scientific classification
- Kingdom: Animalia
- Phylum: Chordata
- Class: Reptilia
- Order: Squamata
- Family: Scincidae
- Genus: Mochlus
- Species: M. vinciguerrae

Binomial name
- Mochlus vinciguerrae (Parker, 1932)

Synonyms
- Lygosoma vinciguerrae Parker, 1932; Riopa vinciguerrae — M.A. Smith, 1937; Mochlus vinciguerrae — Lanza & Carfi, 1968

Species of lizard

Mochlus vinciguerrae, also known commonly as Vinciguerra's writhing skink, is a species of lizard in the family Scincidae. The species is indigenous to East Africa and the Horn of Africa.

== Etymology ==
The specific name, vinciguerrae, is in honor of Italian ichthyologist Decio Vinciguerra.

== Geographic range ==
M. vinciguerrae is found in Ethiopia and Somalia.

== Reproduction ==
M. vinciguerrae is viviparous.
