= Mochlus paedocarinatus =

Scientific classification
- Domain: Eukaryota
- Kingdom: Animalia
- Phylum: Chordata
- Class: Reptilia
- Order: Squamata
- Family: Scincidae
- Genus: Mochlus
- Species: M. paedocarinatus

Binomial name
- Mochlus paedocarinatus Lanza & Carfi, 1968

Species of lizard

Mochlus paedocarinatus, also known as Lanza's writhing skink or Abyssinian writhing skink, is a species of skink. It is found in Somalia and Ethiopia.
