= Bura Irrigation and Settlement Project (Kenya) =

Large irrigation project in Kenya

- Commercial?: No
- Type of project: Irrigation Project (6,700 ha)
- Products: Mainly cotton and maize
- Location: Tana River County
- Founder: National Irrigation Board
- Country: Kenya
- Budget: 766 million Kshs (development cost in 1977)
- Status: Operational under National Irrigation Board

Bura Irrigation (Kenya)

In 1977 the Board of Governors of the World Bank approved Bura Irrigation and Settlement Project (BISP) in Kenya. The project area is situated just South of the Equator in the Lower Tana Basin. It lies on the west bank of the Tana River and falls within the administrative area of Tana River County. The project was an ambitious attempt of the government of Kenya, the World Bank and a few other donors to develop a remote area, create employment for thousands of people with a reasonable income and earn foreign exchange. Bura project would develop about 6,700 net irrigated ha over a 5 1/2 year period and settle on smallholdings about 5,150 landless poor families selected from all parts of Kenya. Physical and social infrastructure would be provided to support the settler and satellite population, expected to reach a total of 65,000 persons by 1985. The total cost of the project was estimated at 92 million dollars in 1977 prices. Actual construction started in 1978. During implementation the costs exploded from $17,500/= per family to $55,000/=, a new record for the World Bank. The largest cost increase was for the irrigation network (615%). The donors were not willing and the government was not able to raise the additional funds and subsequently the size of the project was scaled down from 6,700 ha to 3,900 and later to 2,500 ha, although the irrigation structures were completed for 6,700 ha. In this period 2,100 landless households from all over Kenya were settled in the scheme. They were allocated two plots of 0.625 ha and a garden of 0.05 ha. Each year they were to grow 1.25 ha cotton and 0.625 maize intercropped with cowpeas. Soon it was evident that the project would fail to achieve its objectives. Job creation was only 40% of the target, the economic rate of return was negative and the annual operating and maintenance costs exceeded the benefits. Even with net farm incomes of about 40% of the appraisal estimates in real terms, annual government subsidies amounted to about 1,000 dollars per settler. The project had an unreliable water supply and many buildings had foundation problems. After cotton crop failures due to pests in 1990 the project came virtually to a standstill as the management lacked the funds to finance cotton and maize crops. Most settlers deserted and only the ones with nowhere to go remained in the scheme, living on famine relief and odd jobs. In the period 1993-2005 the government tried a number of times to revive the project, but all in vain. After 2005, rehabilitation and crop growing started in phases and since 2009-10 the tenants have been growing crops, although the cropping pattern fell to no more than 50% of the projected crop intensity and the settlers have low incomes, if any. This is partly caused by the fact that the original cash crop, cotton, is no longer a profitable crop.

== Background ==
During the later 1930s and 1940s the colonial government was already concerned about population pressure and soil erosion. Irrigation was seen as a means to reduce land pressure and the Tana River Basin was seen as the natural area to start irrigated settlements. As early as 1934 Harris and Sampson published their ‘Report on the Tana River Expedition’. In 1948 the colonial government published a study on two 40,000 ha schemes between Bura and Grand Falls. Due to the remoteness and poor soils these projects were uneconomic. In 1956 the government started Hola Pilot Irrigation Project about 40 km south of Bura. From 1963 to 1967 the FAO oversaw the Lower Tana River Basin study. This study was carried out by Ilaco and Acres (two engineering firms) and they proposed to start an irrigation project of minimally 100,000 ha. However, with an economic rate of return of 10% the study showed that the project was economically marginal. One recommendation was to start a research and training centre. Later it was decided that this centre should be a pilot project at Bura and Ilaco was given a contract to carry out a feasibility study. That study, as was the case with most Ilaco studies, was financed by the Netherlands.

== Studies and appraisal ==
=== Ilaco feasibility studies ===
In 1973 Ilaco presented its first feasibility study on Bura. It proposed to develop 4,000 ha for 3,000 tenants. The economic rate of return was calculated at 13.5%. In the meantime feasibility studies in other areas in Kenya had shown disappointed rate of returns for irrigation projects and the Government of Kenya, therefore, proposed that Ilaco makes an even more detailed study for 14,000 ha so that a project that was eligible for financing by the World Bank could be produced. In 1975 Ilaco submitted its report. This report became the basis of the project that eventually materialized. This study envisaged the settlement of 11,000 families on 14,000 ha. The implementation period would take 11 1/2 years and the economic rate of return was calculated at 16%. Although the report raised some questions about the quality of the soils, the Ilaco feasibility study was optimistic and foresaw a bright future for the area.

=== Appraisal by the World Bank ===
Late 1975 a World Bank appraisal mission visited Kenya and in June 1976 the first appraisal report (White Cover) was presented. The document proposed a 14,000 ha project with an economic rate of return of 11%. Internally the World Bank had classified Bura as a "potential difficult and contentious project" because of the level of external financing, incomplete preparation, high cost per family, cost recovery, remote area and settler selection. Interesting enough the soils were not seen as a problem, but a few months after the publication of the White Cover report this issue erupted, when World Bank staff reviewed the details of the soil studies and concluded that the classification of these soils by Ilaco was too optimistic and not justified.

With the appraisal on the verge of collapse, a phased development programme was proposed. Phase I consisted of a project of 6,700 ha with mainly good soils, but also with poorer soils (31%) in order to gain practical experiences with these soils.

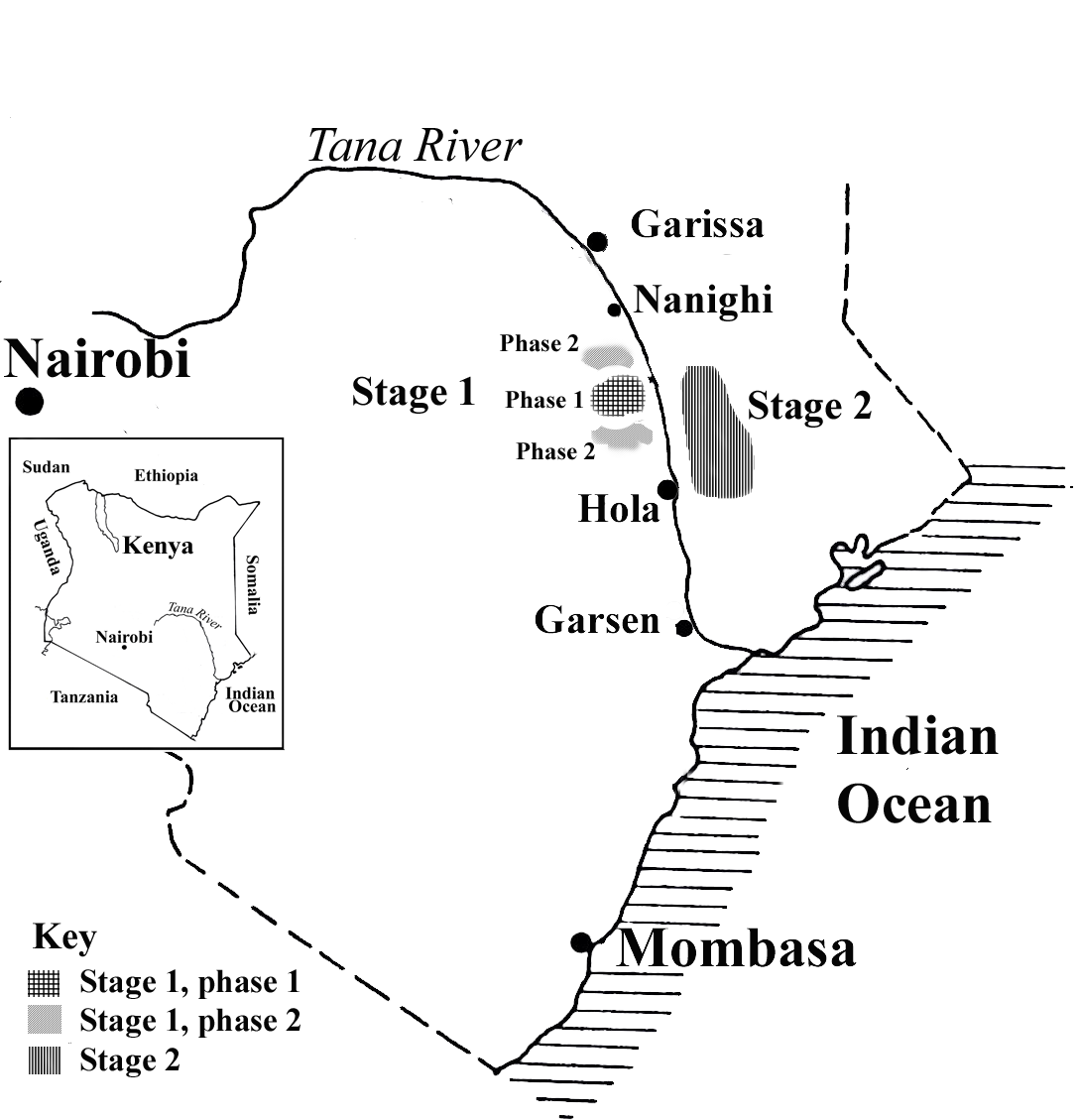
Stages and phases Bura Irrigation Project (Kenya)

If the poorer soils proved to have potential, then phase II of about 6,000 ha with poorer soils would be developed. At this moment the World Bank also introduced Stage II, which was for about 25,000 ha irrigation development on the east bank of the Tana River.

Under normal circumstances the consultants who prepared the feasibility study and the designs would automatically be engaged to supervise the construction. However, the World Bank was not satisfied with the work of Ilaco and insisted on tendering for the position of project consultants. In December 1976 a British consortium, Sir M. MacDonald and Partners and Associated Firms was appointed. Part of the job of the firm was to prepare an implementation report (Project Planning Report), review the Ilaco studies, reformulate the project at a reduced scale and provide essential data to the appraisal report. Indeed, the new consultants confirmed the cost estimates given by the World Bank.

The new proposal envisaged 6,700 ha irrigated land for 5,150 landless families from all parts of Kenya. The plan was to construct a diversion structure on the Tana River 46 km above the project. A principal town and 23 villages were to be built along with education, social and administrative facilities and the physical infrastructure (roads, water, electricity) for a population of 65,000 people. Settlers were allocated tenancies of 1,3 ha of which 1,25 ha were for field crops and 0,05 for garden vegetables. An ingenious cropping pattern would make it possible for the tenants to grow 1,25 ha cotton and 0,625 ha maize intercropped with cow peas each year. The total cost of the project was US$91,7 m (Kshs 766 m). Financiers were the IBRD (US$34m), IDA (US$6m), EDF (US$12m), Netherlands (US$8,8m), ODM (US$8,5m) and CDC (US$8,5m). The remaining US$20,6 m was to be financed by Kenya. The tenants were to earn Kshs 7,000 (US$840) yearly and the economic rate of return was calculated at 13%.

The National Irrigation Board (NIB) would be overall responsible for the implementation of the project. However, the World Bank argued that its experience and implementation capacity was limited and therefore experienced consultants should be employed to complete the design, supervise the construction and assist in coordination of all activities.

=== Project Planning Report ===
In September 1977, after many delays the new consultants submitted part of the six volumes comprising Project Planning Report (PPR). Even though the consortium had confirmed the World Bank estimates (based on the Ilaco studies) before the appraisal report was published, MacDonald and partners gave a total cost of US$112,1m (Kshs936 m), an increase of 22%. The cost increase was largely due to much higher consultancy cost and, to a lesser extent, the irrigation works. This surprised, if not shocked, Kenya and the other financiers. Two months after the appraisal, the project was thus already seriously underfunded. Surprisingly, despite the higher cost, the economic rate of return of the project remained at 13%.

One feature of the Project Planning Report was that it linked the implementation of Stages I and II. For instance, the river diversion structure was to be redesigned so that it could serve both Stages. This despite the fact that there existed very little evidence that Stage II could be a viable project.

=== Comparison of key documents ===
A comparison of the unit costs from 1975 to 1977 gives the following:

Description	ILACO 1975	World Bank 1977	MacDonald PPR 1977
Area proposed (ha)	14,560	6,700	6,700
Investment per ha (Kshs)	23,850	114,300	139,700
Investment per ha (US$)	3,400	13,700	16,700
Total settler families	10,785	5,150	5,150
Investment per family (Kshs)	32,200	148,680	181,700
Investment per family (US$)	4,500	17,800	21,800
Economic Rate of Return	16%	13%	13%

In its studies Ilaco argued that a cost increase of 10% would lower the economic rate of return with one percentage point. As the table above shows, however, cost increases of 600% resulted only in a minor change of the economic rate of return. The following parameters were changed to keep the economic rate of return, despite huge cost increases, at an acceptable level:

- Shadow pricing of the Kshs at a value of 11 Kshs as compared with the official dollar rate at that time of 8.35.
- Shortening the implementation period.
- Huge increases in the yield of the main crops in the early years even though there was no new evidence that could justify such increases.
- Defining a number of investment cost as non-project and hence excluding them, at least partly, from the cost benefit analysis. For instance, the World Bank defined only 75% of the social infrastructure as project costs.
- Many other, often minor changes, which almost always resulted in a higher rate of return.

In the PPR, apart from changing other parameters, the consultant introduced a completely new method of retaining the rate of return of the project at an acceptable level by apportioning investments to Stage I, phase II and Stage II. By claiming, for instance, that the river diversion works could serve an area of 37 000 on both the east and the west bank, it attributed only 6,700 ha (18%) to Stage I, phase I. At various places it has been pointed out that there existed no methodological justification for this way of calculating the internal rate of return. If phase II and Stage II would ever be implemented, then the remaining 82% of the cost of the diversion weir would have been defined as sunk cost and also not be included in the cost benefit analysis. By excluding them now, these costs would never be included in any cost benefit analysis.

== Implementation ==
=== Major design changes ===
Whereas the formal agreements between Kenya and the World Bank were signed in June 1977 the implementation was delayed due to a number of factors. Firstly Kenya and the consultants needed about 10 months before they could agree on a new consultancy contract. The outcome of these negotiations was that the consultancy cost almost doubled. Secondly, during the preparation of the final designs, major modifications were made by the consultants on both the intake and the irrigation structure. These changes caused not only new delays, but also, for instance, an increase of concrete structures in the main canal with 138%, stone pitching with 338% and digging with 255%. In 1979 the World Bank concluded that both the original design of Ilaco and MacDonald's design were based on sound engineering principles. Rejection of the new design would have resulted in further delays and fearing further delays the World Bank accepted the new design. According to the World Bank, however, design changes would result in a cost increase of 65% in real terms. At that time the economic rate of return of the project was at best 4%. Also one of the financiers (CDC) withdrew and as a result of this the part to be financed by Kenya, depending on the project formulation, increased to between 50 and 65% in real terms of the total project cost.

=== Construction ===
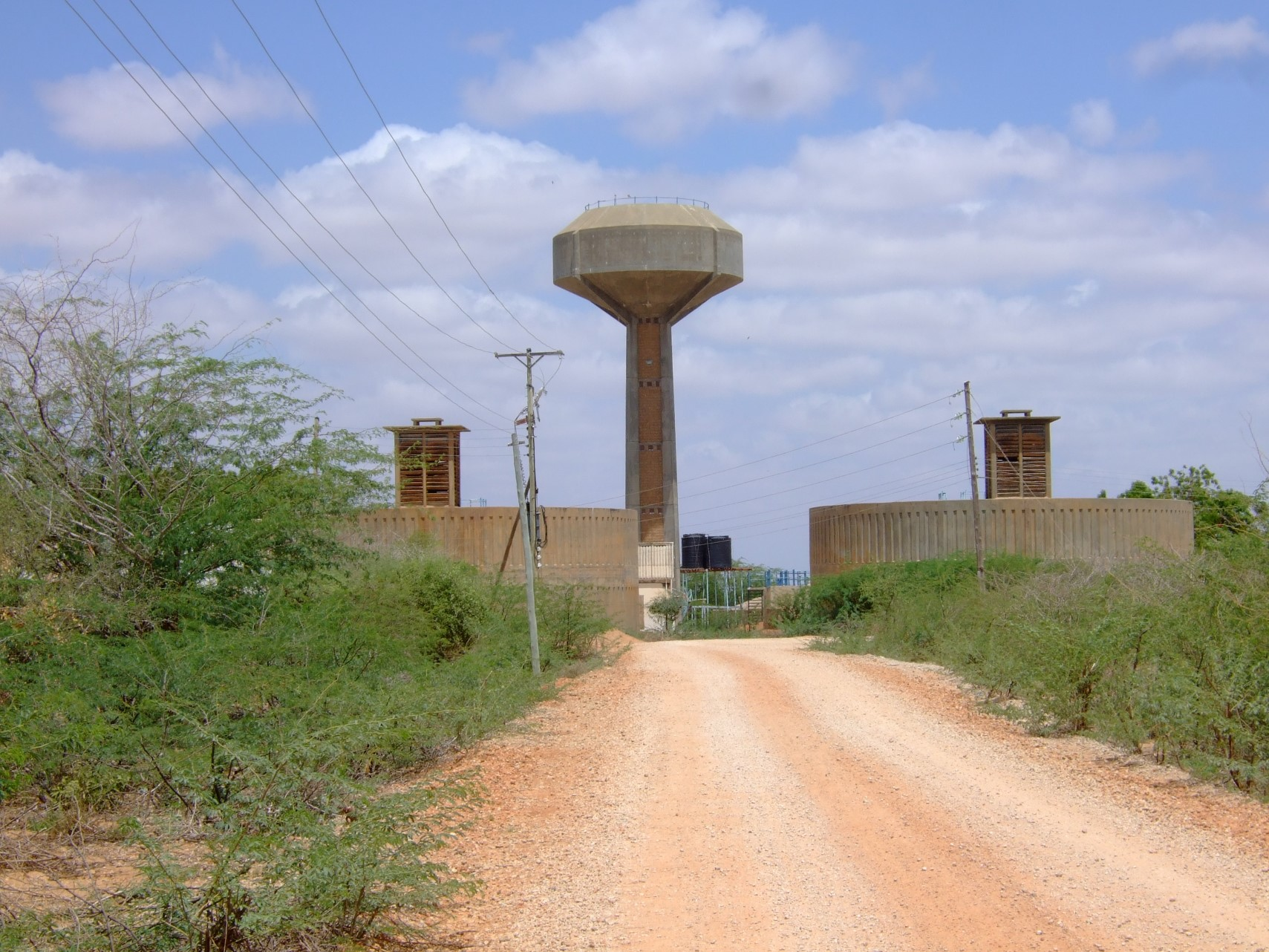
Water treatment works at Bura.

Project construction began in mid 1979, two years late, and by mid 1982 construction was about three years behind schedule. During construction the cost continued to escalate and in September 1982 the Bank calculated an increase of 87% for the base cost. If the cost increases due to delays were included, the total cost had at least trebled. Huge cost increases were registered for the construction the tenant houses and the domestic waste supply. At the same time studies on the quality of the soils on the East Bank showed that these soils were so poor that further investigations were no longer justified and the idea of a stage II was shelved.

=== Financial crises ===
In this period the local inflation rate climbed and this was accompanied by a fall in the value of the Kenyan Shilling. Together with the cost escalation, the part which Kenya had to finance grew bigger and bigger and this alarmed the government. A few new donors (Finnida and the World Food Programme) committed funds, but these funds amounted only to a few million dollars. Also OPEC and Kuwait committed funds for the intake and the ginnery, but since their funding financed only part of these components, these funds did not solve the crisis but would actually increase it. Subsequently, a special government committee was established to control the cost. The committee advised, following earlier advice from the consultants, to postpone and later to cancel the river intake structure. A temporary pumping station designed to operate for a few years, pending the completion of the river works, would become permanent. Other project components, e.g. the ginnery, were also cancelled. To further reduce the cost, the quantity and quality of the houses and roads was reduced. The forest component of the project was drastically trimmed down from 3,900 ha to 650 ha. All the cost saving measures still did not reduce the financial burden for the government of Kenya to an acceptable level and the government decided to reduce the project area to 3,900ha and later to 2,500ha. After these decisions the Bura project still took about 40% yearly of the investment budget of the Ministry of Agriculture.

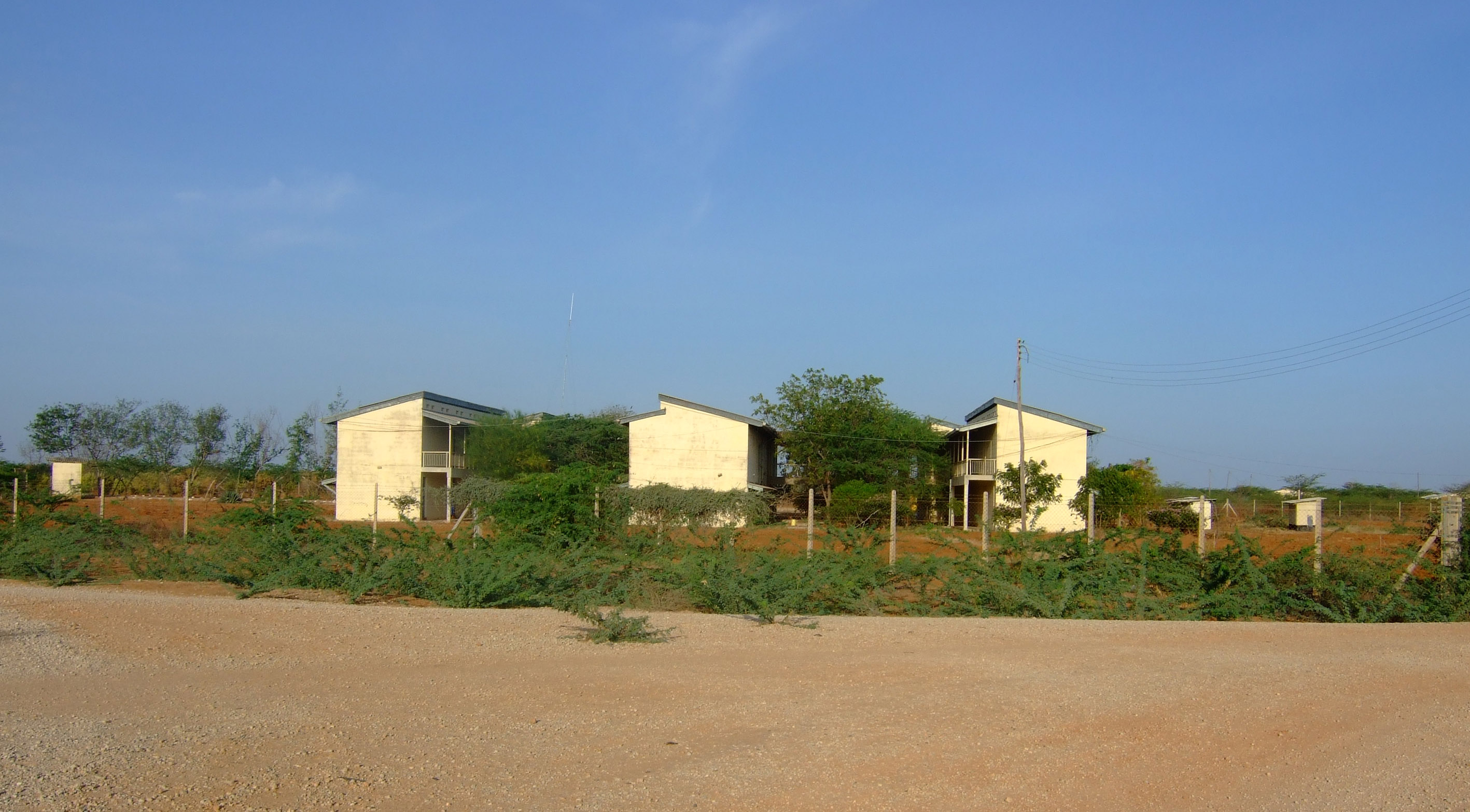
Bura Irrigation Project headquarters at Bura.

Especially the decision to cancel the river works was later criticised as this would jeopardise the supply of water to the project. However, in 1979 the consultants had calculated that a project with a pumping station would have a much lower capital cost and, subsequently, a much higher rate of return than a project with a gravity intake. The implicit recommendation was that a gravity intake was not only very costly, but also unnecessary. This conclusion was embraced by the government and subsequently it shelved the gravity intake. However, there was serious catch in this, which was not included in the analysis of the consultant: the high, projected yields of cotton and maize were partly based on the fact that the project had a gravity and thus a secure supply of irrigation water. Therefore, when calculating the rate of return for the project with a pumping station the consultants should have used lower yields for cotton and maize in their economic analysis. They did not do this and in this way they got the advantages of both gravity (higher yields) and pumping (low investment costs).

=== Project completion ===
The final project consisted of 2,500 ha and some parts were done for more than 75% (water supply, irrigation network, supply, main and branch canals and the NIB offices). Other parts were done for about 1/3 (primary schools, health facilities, tenant houses). Important components as the cotton ginnery, river diversion structure, feasibility study East Bank, housing for teachers, social halls and the 132 KV transmission line were not implemented. Despite all the omissions and reductions the final cost of the project was estimated by the World Bank at 105 million dollars or 1,180 million Kshs. With a cost of Kshs 472,000 ($55,000) per ha the project became a new high for the World Bank. The World Bank considered the project completed in 1988.

=== Sunk cost ===
During the financial crises economic reviews were published regularly. In all economic reviews an acceptable economic rate of return and thus, in the eyes of the reviewers, a viable project, was presented to the financiers based on sunk-costs principles, that is to say that already invested funds and commitments were excluded from the cost-benefit analysis. Such an analysis, however, easily disguises serious underlying problems. In the case of Bura all the reviews showed also that after the investment period, the project would still need a considerable annual subsidy from the government. In the most thorough and realistic review this subsidy was calculated at about Ksh20 million. The project was also very sensitive to changes in the project cost and yields. The same study also showed that the close-down of the project was possible for a one-off amount of Ksh 40 million. For different reasons the various parties never saw closing down the project as an option.

=== Settlement of tenants ===
While priority was given to local inhabitants, tenants for Bura were drawn from all parts of Kenya. They had to meet the following criteria: heads of households must be aged between 25 and 45 years and preferably married, must be landless, unemployed or underemployed or earn an income below the minimum agricultural wage, must be medically and physically fit, must provide the equivalent of four adult labour units, must be of good character and should have a rural or farming background. Late 1981 the first group of about 330 settlers arrived and by mid 1984 the total number of tenants living in the scheme was 1,802. They came from Coast Province (35%), Central (24%), Eastern (13%), Nyanza (8%), Western (8%), Rift Valley (6%) and others (6%). In 1988 the number of tenants was estimated at 2,139. Life at Bura was difficult for the tenants and desertion rates in the period 1981-1984 were estimated at between 20 and 30%.

The NIB provided the tenants with housing, transport, food, tools and a subsistence advance of Kshs 300 per month for incoming tenants until the first cash crop was harvested. The tenants repaid this advance over a period of three years. When the tenants arrived, often the farm land was not ready and this resulted in late planting, low cotton yields and thus low incomes.

== Production ==
=== Early years ===
From 1977 until 1985 the project was governed by the National Irrigation Board (NIB). During this period the World Bank and other donors had a low opinion of the NIB's management of Bura and their pressure resulted into a transfer of the project from the NIB to the Ministry of Agriculture and Livestock Development in 1985. After 1989 it was transferred to other ministries. and in 2005 it was reverted to the NIB. When Bura resorted under ministries as a kind of semi-independent department, usually the NIB fell also under this ministry. The main difference was that the NIB had a parastatal status and Bura Project lacked this protection. Hence whenever Bura moved to a new ministry, it had to fight for accounting privileges as a ‘production’ unit. The existing accounting procedures within ministries were rarely conducive for a smooth operation of the production unit Bura, .

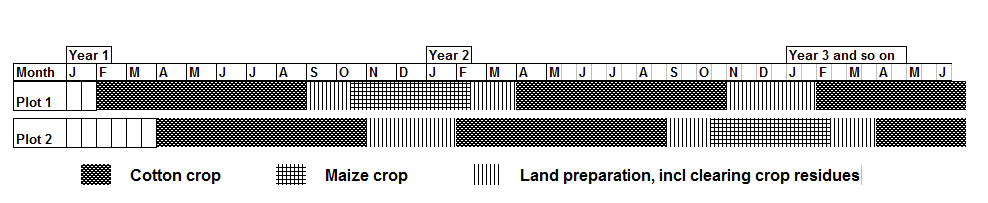
Cropping pattern at Bura

Every tenant was allocated two plots of 0.625 ha and a garden of 0.05 ha. Each year the tenants were to grow 1.25 ha cotton (main season) and 0.625 maize intercropped with cowpeas (off-season). After the fourth year 0.2 ha of the maize would be replaced with the much more profitable groundnuts. The cropping pattern of 148% was very tight as together the maize and cotton crops needed almost a year in the field and thus there was very little time left for land preparation. To solve this problem an ingenious cropping system was developed in which each tenant had two plots. On one plot he would plant early cotton (1 February) and after harvesting the cotton he would plant maize and harvest maize. Next year, this plot will then be ready for late cotton (March-early April). After the late cotton is harvested, there will be enough time to prepare the land for the early cotton. The second plot would start with late cotton, then early cotton, maize and again late cotton. Planting cotton after early April not only results in low yields but also disrupts the whole cropping calendar. In practice this cropping pattern lacked flexibility and planting periods for cotton of four months occurred. A comparison of the projected yield and the actual production figures for cotton and maize is given in the tables below:

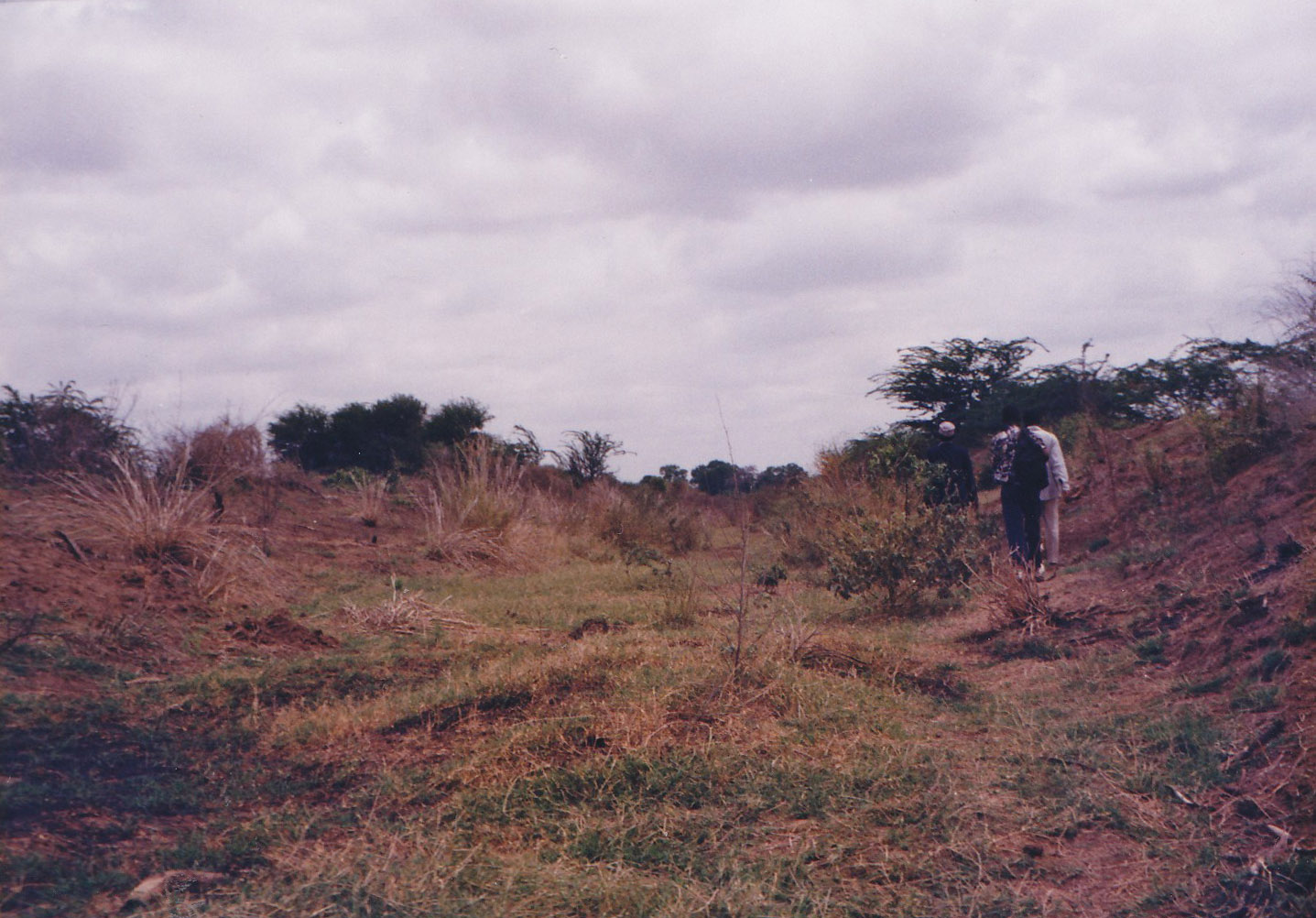
Irrigation Supply Canal at Nanighi. This picture was taken after the El Nino rains of 1997–1998. The floods destroyed a huge protection dyke and subsequently the irrigation supply canal was destroyed. It took years before it was repaired.

Comparison of projected cotton yield with actual yields

Year	WB projection in tonnes 1977 ^{[A]}	Actual production in tonnes	WB projected yield per ha (kg) 1977	Actual yield per ha (kg)
1980	1,092	0	0	0
1981	5,703	0	0	0
1982	12,319	1,641	2,500	2,256
1983	16,996	1,478	2,550	2,043
1984	17,640	4,510	2,550 ^{[B]}	2,144
1985	18,284	5,204	2,625	2,106
1986	18,844	4,271	2,725	1,816
1987	19,208	5,522	2,825	2,239
1988	19,320	5,500	2,925	2,251
1989	19,320	1,440 ^{[C]}	3,000	1,180
1990	19,320	1,680 ^{[D]}	3,000	1,112
1991	19,320	930 ^{[E]}	3,000	504
1992-2005	19,320	0 ^{[F]}	3,000	0

^{A} All projections are derived from the World Bank appraisal report 1977.
^{B} Tenants were to harvest 2,500 kg in their first year, 2,600 kg in their second, 2,700 in their third, 2,800 kg in their fourth, 2,900 kg in their fifth and after 3,000 kg. Many settlers grew their first cotton crop in this year and started thus with a yield of 2,500. This resulted in the same average projection as in the previous year.
^{C} Pest problems.
^{D} In this cropping season there was a serious water problem.
^{E} Good water, but very serious pest problems.
^{F} No cotton was grown due to the collapse of the scheme (see below).

Comparison of projected maize yield with actual yields

Year	WB projection in tonnes 1977 ^{[A]}	Actual production in tonnes	WB projected yield per ha (kg) ^{[B]}	Actual yield per ha (kg)
1979	810	0	0	0
1980	2,890	0	0	0
1981	5,900	560	2,000	2,800 ^{[C]}
1982	7,700	1,736	2,300	3,100
1983	8,300	1,840	2,300 ^{[D]}	2,300
1984	8,410	1,870	2,500	1,700
1985	8,550	2,040	2,850	1,700
1986	8,480	850	3,400	1,700
1987	8,150	1,700	3,600	1,700
1988	7,780	no figures	3,700	no figures
1989	7,620	1,942	3,700	1,500
1990 ^{[E]}	7620	0	3,700	0
1991 ^{[F]}	7,620	216	3,700	1,080
1992^{[F]}	7,620	216	3,700	1,080
1993 ^{[G]}	7,620	0	3,700	0
1994-2005 ^{[H]}	7,620	0	3,700	0

^{A} All projections are derived from the World Bank appraisal report 1977.
^{B} Maize was supposed to be intercropped with cowpeas, and this would increase the value of the 'maize' harvest with 50%. The planting of cowpeas never materialized. It was also planned that the tenants would grow groundnuts, a high value crop, but this turned out not to be possible. This implies that the projected maize figures should be 50% higher to make them fully comparable with the actual yields.
^{C} Contrary to the cotton records, the maize production figures are considered to be unreliable. This applies certainly to the 1982 and 1983 statistics, but even the figures for the years after 1983 are considered to be inflated. Vainio-Matilla estimates the yields per ha of most farmers below 600 kg/ha
^{D} Tenants were to harvest 2,000 kg in their first year, 2,500 kg in their second, 2,800 kg in their third, 3,100 kg in their fourth, 3,400 kg in their fifth and in their sixth and after 3,700 kg. Many new settlers arrived in this period and they grew their first maize crop in this year and started thus with a yield of 2,000 kg. This resulted in the same average projection as the previous year.
^{E} In 1989 the cropping pattern at Bura was in disarray and in order to reorganize planting, one maize crop was skipped.
^{F} In this maize season there was a serious water problem.
^{G} All government funds were frozen.
^{H} The project had collapsed (see below) and no maize was grown.

As the tables show the production in the project was very disappointing. If it is taken into account that no cowpeas and groundnuts have been planted, the picture becomes even worse. A mid-term review in 1985 projected a cash income for the tenants between Kshs 5,000 and 6,000 for the year 1984. For the years after 1985 it calculated an income of Kshs 7,400 (55% of the appraisal estimate in real terms) if the cotton yield would be 2,500 kg. With an average yield of 2,005 for the years 1982–1989, the cash income would have been about Kshs 5,620 or almost 40% of the appraisal estimate. In 1986 75% of the tenants received a cash income and 25% nothing. In 1989 only 35% of the tenants received a cash income and following year only 20% of the tenants received an cash income. After 1992 no production took place and the tenants no longer received any cash income.

Thus, tenant incomes have been disappointing, but it is doubtful whether incomes would have been better with higher yields, as a trade-off exist between the tenant incomes and the annual loss that the project makes. In 1990, the World Bank pointed out that the project made an annual loss of Kshs 17,000 per settler. If the project wanted to be financially viable, then the tenants were expected to pay this annual loss through their service charges. At Bura, the tenants paid Kshs 3,000 per settler, but to reach a break-even point, the tenants should have paid a much higher amount, meaning that tenants would not earn any income. The project management finds itself in a balancing act that on the one hand it has to keep the charges at such a level that the tenants do not lose interest in farming, whereas at the same time it needs to keep the annual loss on its operations as low as possible. In the beginning the project got adequate government support to take care of the losses, although a side effect was that the operation and maintenance of the project suffered. Later the government support was reduced.

=== Afforestation and the spread of Prosopis ===
Spread of Prosopis in Bura.

In order to avoid the destruction of the riverine forest and other environmental damage in Bura, a plantation programme was included in the BISP. The World Bank estimated that 3,900 ha forest would be necessary. It calculated that the cost of irrigating would be low, as surplus water would be used. In the early nineties the area was scaled down to 600 ha. In 1983 the NIB forester established a plot of 10 ha with Prosopis. Later this plot was the main source of seeds for other treeplanting activities and for natural regeneration of ‘wild’ Prosopis.

After establishment of the forest plots, Prosopis spread vigorously outside the plantations. Animals ate the pods and moved around the scheme dispersing the seeds in their droppings. Whenever water was available, seeds in the droppings germinated readily and within a few years almost all canal sides in Bura were occupied by this fast growing shrub. This ‘wild’ Prosopis, in Tana River County popularly known as Mathenge, did not limit itself to the canal banks and it also blossomed along roads, in the fields and villages. By 1991, Prosopis had solved the fuelwood problem and tenants even earned income by burning charcoal. The pods were used as animal food and wind erosion in the area was reduced. Unfortunately eradicating the tree at unwanted places as in the fields and along the canal banks was almost impossible because after cutting the stumps coppice vigorously and within a few months, as long as a little water is available, a new shrub has emerged. As early as 1992, experts concluded that whatever the future of BISP, Prosopis will remain there permanently and will change the environment.

=== Collapse of BISP ===
After 1992 until 2004 production in Bura Irrigation and Settlement Project was negligible. The cumulative effect of a number of factors caused this failure. The main underlying reason was lack of funds to operate the project. Since 1989 the project did not receive enough funds for cultivating a full crop cycle. Together with poor pest control and lack of adequate irrigation water, this resulted in very low yields and crop failures. Two external factors made the situation worse. Firstly the insecurity in Somalia spilled over into Tana County and the Bura Project area was regularly attacked by well-armed roaming bandits. Secondly, due to high inflation and economic liberalization the prices for agricultural inputs skyrocketed. Thus, the cost for chemicals was Ksh 1,850 in 1987 and 12,000 per ha in 1992. The price for fertilizer went up from 260 to 1,000 per bag. At the same time the cotton price in 1992 remained Ksh 16/= kg, as it had been in 1987. For a full crop cycle the management needed Ksh 98 million and it had received only 10.4 million. Moreover, the figure of 98 million did not include expenditure for maintenance of the inlet and settling basin, the conveyance system, domestic water supply, maintenance of houses, roads and the sewerage system. At that time the conveyance system was considered to have silted up and to need a full rehabilitation. A few years later a study estimated that in total 500 000m^{3} silt would have to be removed.

Since no agricultural production took place, by 1996 at least one third of the tenants had abandoned the project. The remaining population were mainly women and children as most adult men had left the project to find work elsewhere. In addition to remittances, households were surviving on odd jobs for government, National Youth Service and BISP staff, on charcoal burning and small scale trade. A few NGOs assisted and once in a while famine relief was distributed by both the government and NGOs. Research in 1996 showed that 90% of the Bura population was ‘at risk and vulnerable’. Most of the people remaining in Bura had no place to go and hoped that the project would be revived. This belief/dream was further dented when during the El Nino rains of 1997 a huge protection dyke at Nanighi was washed away. Subsequently, the supply canal became part of the natural drainage system and repairs would be a costly affair.

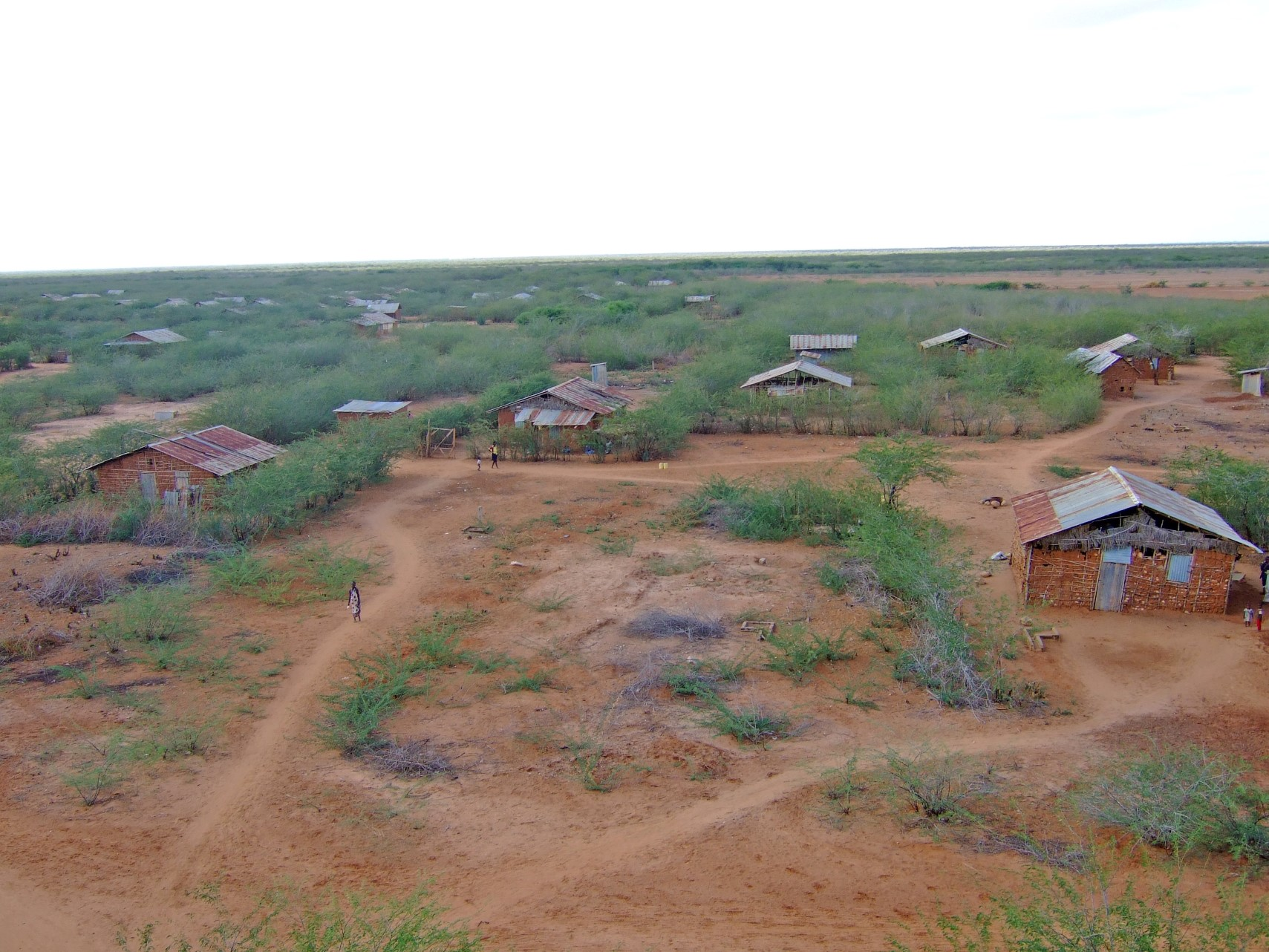
One of the ten villages in BISP. At the time of taking this picture in 2008, about 50% of the houses still existed.

== Rehabilitation, Production and Indebtedness ==
In the early stages there was hardly any change after the return of Bura to the NIB. Although the NIB carried out rehabilitation works and installed two new pumps, little production took place until the Economic Stimulus Programme (ESP) was initiated in 2009. The objective of ESP was to jump-start the Kenyan economy towards long-term growth and development after the 2007/2008 post-election violence that affected the Kenyan economy. Earlier in 2007 the government had launched Vision 2030 and one of its flagships was the Bura Irrigation Scheme. Logically Bura became one of the main projects to benefit from the ESP. Under ESP, Bura was to be fully rehabilitated and even expanded. The NIB has claimed that rehabilitation of about 2,500 ha took place successfully, but very little information has been released about the actual area planted with crops, crop production, the number of tenants and their income.

After the rehabilitation the NIB introduced a new management system. Since its inception the management of the scheme had been responsible for the water supply and bought inputs centrally. Also the management organized spraying, ploughing and marketing. After harvesting the management deducted the cost of these services from the proceeds of its tenants. In 2002 the NIB had restructured itself and remained only with core functions, the most important one being the supply of irrigation water. The other functions were delegated to the private sector and tenants were to be given loans to pay for these services, including the water supply, by commercial financial institutions. At Bura, Equity Bank became the sole active financial institution. Equity charged 10% interest whereas before the tenants did not pay interest. Although water is the main task of the NIB, the tenants in the scheme regularly criticised the NIB for not delivering enough water for the crops as per its mandate.

This management system could work if a viable cropping pattern would be available, but this was and is lacking at Bura. Tenants planted cotton in 2010 and 2011. In 2010 most tenants made a small profit, but in the next year the crop failed, leaving the tenants without income and with debts with Equity Bank. Since then no cotton has been cultivated as it is considered non-profitable. For food the tenants grew maize, but this crop was commercially not viable and although it has provided the tenants with the necessary subsistence food, it also resulted in more arrears. Moreover, when the tenants wanted to market their surplus maize, there was no market available. Alternative crops (chillies) have also not been successful and left tenants with debts as well. The only crop which has been grown with success is seed maize. Unfortunately, due to the quality of the soils, the margins for this crop are low at Bura and do not make it possible for the tenants to repay already existing debts or to pay for the cost of their food maize.

The NIB has not released production and income figures for the Bura tenants. It has presented the production figures of all its schemes but Bura in the Economic Review. The information on its website is scanty and annual reports have not been produced despite the fact that parastatals are legally obliged to publish these. The NIB has also not published the total debts of the tenants with Equity Bank. The Bura Farmers Welfare Watch Tower, a local pressure group of tenants, has stated that Equity Bank has reported 65% of the tenants to Credit Reference Bureaus. Officially these tenants have no longer access to credit facilities and could thus no longer grow crops.

The indebtedness of the tenants became also a matter of concern for the NIB and it replaced Equity Bank with the Agricultural Finance Corporation (AFC), a wholly government-owned Development Finance Institution (DFI). Since 2014 the AFC has financed the production of food and later also of seed maize. AFC disregarded the CBR advice and all tenants were eligible for loans for its loans. Unfortunately there was no market for the surplus food maize produced by the tenants in the first year and this forced farmers to sell their produce for low prices and made it impossible to repay even part of their debts. Many of these tenants were blacklisted by AFC and had again no longer access to credit. In practice this means that these tenants cannot grow any crop at all. In December 2015 a large part of the seed maize crop failed due to lack of irrigation water. This time, and for the first time, the tenants started a legal procedure against the NIB demanding that it compensates the tenants fully for their losses. According to the chairman of the Bura Farmers Welfare Watch Tower, in 2016 the total debt of the tenants (Equity and AFC) was Kshs 240 million or about Ksh 100,000 per tenant.

== Bura in perspective ==
The future for Bura's tenants looks bleak. In the meantime (2017) about half of the original tenants have died and the remaining ones are old and fragile. Business people have started to hire plots from (absentee) tenants for small amounts to grow especially seed maize. Since these people do not have to plant food, they can make a profit. Many members of the second generation left Bura and after having seen the collapse, have limited interest in returning. The original and second generation tenants still living in Bura hope that a gravity water supply will improve their fate, but it is unclear when this will be implemented and be ready. Without viable cropping pattern, however, gravity will have little impact apart from making the production of food crops cheaper. In the opinion of the management, genetically modified cotton varieties might become a viable crop. So far the only conclusion can be that, apart from a few years in the eighties, the tenants at Bura have had a miserable life despite the gigantic amounts of money that have been invested. Bura is one of the clearest examples of what Moris has described as a privileged solution in his article 'Írrigation: a privileged solution in African Development'. A privileged solution, in the analysis of Moris, is thought not to require testing and analysis. It is assumed that the solution will deliver and no critical analysis is made of the past performance or its cost effectiveness. A person challenging this solution is ridiculed. In Kenya, obviously, irrigation has this status. Irrigation is postulated as the solution for food problems and drought without analysing the extremely poor performance of this sector. And Bura Irrigation and Settlement Project is the outstanding example of irrigation as a privileged solution. -->

== Bibliography ==
- Bennett, M., Hamilton, P., and Harrison, M. (1991), Mid-term Review of the Bura Fuelwood Project, Phase II. Finnida: Helsinki.
- Chambers, R. (1969), Settlement Schemes in Tropical Africa; a study of organizations and Development. London: Routledge & Kegan Paul.
- Dewar, R.J., et al. (1984), Mid-Term Evaluation 1984. World Bank.
- FAO (1968), Survey of the irrigation potential of the Lower Tana River Basin, eight volumes. Rome, FAO/SF: 53/Ken-3.
- Fitzgerald, M. (1978), How cost effective is the Bura Project. African Business: October, 31–33.
- GIBB, see Sir Alexander et al.
- Government of Kenya, 2007 Kenya Vision 2030; A Globally Competitive and Prosperous Kenya. October 2007.
- Ilaco,(1973), Tana river feasibility studies: the Bura area. Arnhem: Ilaco.
- Ilaco (1975), Bura irrigation scheme: feasibility study. Arnhem: Ilaco.
- Johansson, (1992), Irrigation and development in the Tana River Basin. In Darkoh M.B.K. (ed.) African river basins and dryland crises,97-112. Uppsala: Uppsala University.
- Kenya National Bureau of Statistics (2016), Economic Survey, 2016.
- Laar, A.J.M. van de (1979), The World Bank and the Poor. Smiet Offset.
- Leeuw, W. de (1982), Recruitment of tenants and some social aspects related to the early settlement of people in Bura Irrigation Settlement Scheme.Nairobi: NIB/Free University.
- Leeuw, W. de (1985), Bura Irrigation en Settlement Project. Hengelo
- Leeuw, W. de (1986), Bura Irrigation and Settlement Project; not even an illusion of development. Summary and conclusions. The Hague: Ministry of foreign Affairs.
- Lele, U., ed.(1992), Aid to African agriculture; lessons from two decades of donors' experience. Baltimore: Johns Hopkins University Press.
- Mendes, D.M. and Paglietti, L. (2015), Kenya Irrigation Market Brief. FAO: Rome.
- Moris, J. (1987), Irrigation as a Privileged Solution in African Development. Development Policy Review, Vol 5: 99–123.
- National Irrigation Board (2013), Bura Irrigation Scheme Brief, Summary. Nairobi.
- Nyassy, D. (2010), Hola and Tarda Scheme amongst Success Stories. Daily Nation of 09.06.2010.
- Rowlands, J.S.S. (1995), An outline of Tana River History. Kenya national Archives: reel no 3/5, section 9.
- Ruigu, G.M., Alila, P.O. and Chitere, P.A. (1984),Bura Irrigation Settlement project; a social economic survey. Nairobi: IDS.
- Sir Alexander GIBB & Partners (1997), Bura/Hola Irrigation and Settlement Rehabilitation Project Feasibility Study. Ministry of Land Reclamation, Regional and Water Development: Nairobi.
- Sir M. MacDonald and Partners and Associated Firms (1977), Bura Irrigation Settlement Project, Project Planning Report. Cambridge.
- Sir M. MacDonald and Partners and Associated Firms (1979), An Economic Review 1979. Cambridge.
- Sir M. MacDonald and Partners and Associated Firms (1981), An Economic Review 1981. Cambridge.
- Tiffen, M.(1987), Dethroning the internal rate of return: the evidence from irrigation projects. Development Policy Review, Vol V: 361–377.
- Waiyaki, N.N. (2006), Socio-Economic Evaluation of Bura Irrigation Scheme. Nairobi.
- World Bank (1977), Bura Irrigation Settlement Project; appraisal report, no 1446-KE. Washington: World Bank.
- World Bank (1990), Bura Irrigation Settlement Project (Credit 722-KE/Loan- 1449-KE). Project Completion Report, Kenya. Washington: World Bank.
- World Bank (1990a), Project Performance Audit Report Kenya; Bura Irrigation Settlement Project. Washington: World Bank
- World Bank (1992): Effective Implementation: Key to Development Impact, Portfolio Management Task Force. Washington: World Bank. Popularly known as the Wapenhans report.
