= Mochlus mafianus =

Conservation status
- Least Concern (IUCN 3.1)

Scientific classification
- Kingdom: Animalia
- Phylum: Chordata
- Class: Reptilia
- Order: Squamata
- Suborder: Scinciformata
- Infraorder: Scincomorpha
- Family: Lygosomidae
- Genus: Mochlus
- Species: M. mafianus

Binomial name
- Mochlus mafianus (Broadley, 1994)

Synonyms
- Lygosoma mafianum Broadley, 1994; Mochlus mafianum (Broadley, 1994) (orth. error)

Species of lizard

Mochlus mafianus, also known as the Mafia writhing skink, is a species of skink. It is found on Mafia and Kisuju Islands, off the coast of Tanzania. It inhabits coastal woodland and savanna.
