= Mochlus productus =

Conservation status
- Least Concern (IUCN 3.1)

Scientific classification
- Kingdom: Animalia
- Phylum: Chordata
- Class: Reptilia
- Order: Squamata
- Suborder: Scinciformata
- Infraorder: Scincomorpha
- Family: Lygosomidae
- Genus: Mochlus
- Species: M. productus

Binomial name
- Mochlus productus (Boulenger, 1909)

Species of lizard

Boulenger's writhing skink (Mochlus productus) is a species of skink found in Somalia.
