= Mochlus grandisonianus =

Conservation status
- Data Deficient (IUCN 3.1)

Scientific classification
- Kingdom: Animalia
- Phylum: Chordata
- Class: Reptilia
- Order: Squamata
- Family: Scincidae
- Genus: Mochlus
- Species: M. grandisonianus

Binomial name
- Mochlus grandisonianus Lanza & Carfi, 1966

Synonyms
- Mochlus grandisonianus Lanza & Carfi, 1966; Lygosoma grandisonianum — Lanza, 1990; Mochlus grandisonianum — Feldman et al., 2015; Mochlus grandisonianus — Mazuch, 2021

Species of lizard

Mochlus grandisonianus, also known commonly as Lanza's writhing skink, is a species of lizard in the family Scincidae. The species is endemic to Somalia.

== Etymology ==
The specific name, grandisonianus, is in honor of British herpetologist Alice Georgie Cruickshank "Bunty" Grandison.

== Geographic range ==
M. grandisonianus is found in northeastern Somalia, where it has been found in Bari region and Mudug region.

== Habitat ==
The preferred natural habitat of M. grandisonianus is sand.

== Reproduction ==
The mode of reproduction of M. grandisonianus is unknown.
