= Mochlus pembanus =

Conservation status
- Least Concern (IUCN 3.1)

Scientific classification
- Kingdom: Animalia
- Phylum: Chordata
- Class: Reptilia
- Order: Squamata
- Suborder: Scinciformata
- Infraorder: Scincomorpha
- Family: Lygosomidae
- Genus: Mochlus
- Species: M. pembanus

Binomial name
- Mochlus pembanus (Boettger, 1913)

Synonyms
- Lygosoma pembanum Boettger, 1913; Mochlus pembanum (Boettger, 1913) (orth. error); Riopa pembanum (Boettger, 1913)

Species of lizard

Mochlus pembanus, also known as the Pemba Island writhing skink, is a species of skink. It is found on Pemba Island off the coast of Tanzania and in coastal Kenya; the latter could be introductions.

Mochlus pembanus is fossorial and nocturnal. It occurs in coastal woodland and in a range of agricultural habitats. It is very common on Pemba and regularly encountered in Kenya. It can grow to 89 mm (3.5 in) in snout–vent length.
