= Thika River =

River in central Kenya

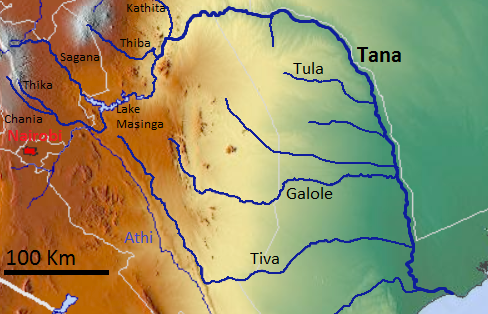
Thika River (top left)

The Thika River flows through Kiambu County in central Kenya and is a tributary of the Tana River. The river forms a psychological boundary between the counties of Murang'a and Kiambu. The Thika River is a significant source of hydroelectric power in Kenya and provides most of the water supply for Nairobi, Kenya's capital and largest city.

The name Thika originates either from the Kikuyu language or from the Maasai language. It may relate to the Kikuyu word guthika, which means to bury. It also resembles the Maasai word sika, which means to rub something away from an edge.

== Course ==
The Thika River originates in the Aberdare Range. It flows to the Tana River, which empties into the Indian Ocean.

A landmark along the river's course is Thika Falls, near the town of Thika. Thika Falls has a drop of about 25 metres (82 ft) in a wilderness area within walking distance of the Blue Post Hotel, one of the oldest hotels in Kenya.

== Ecology ==
During the early twentieth century, colonial big game hunters noted hippopotamus and crocodiles along the deeper sections of the river. Baboons and leopards inhabited the forest near Thika Falls. Antelopes and zebras lived in the open country upriver from the falls. Rhinoceros, lions, and hyenas also resided in the area. Most of the game today relocated either upriver to the Aberdares forest or downriver due to pressure from increased human settlement along the river.

== Water source ==
Eighty percent of the water supply for Nairobi, Kenya's capital city, comes from the Thika River.

Deforestation and overgrazing along the river's heavily populated course have caused soil erosion problems. Sediments have reduced river flow, reservoir size, and water quality. Water quality has also deteriorated due to pesticide runoff.

== Hydroelectricity ==
The Thika is part of the Tana basin, the most extensively engineered of Kenya's major arid watersheds. Hydroelectric power from the Thika River supplies a significant portion of Kenya's electricity. The first proposal for exploiting the Thika River's hydroelectric potential was put forward shortly after World War I by Guglielmo Marconi as a means for supplying power for a planned radio communications station in Nairobi. Marconi's plan was not implemented, but in 1994 the Thika Dam was constructed with a resulting water reservoir of 70 million cubic metres (15 billion imperial gallons; 18 billion US gallons). The Thika River also contributes to the Masinga Reservoir, which serves the Seven Forks Dams. Taken together, three-quarters of Kenya's electrical supply derives from these dams.
