= Gitaru Hydroelectric Power Station =

Kenyan power station

- Location within Kenya
- Interactive map of Gitaru Hydroelectric Power Station
- Country: Kenya
- Location: Embu County/Machakos County
- Coordinates: 00°47′43″S 37°45′09″E
- Purpose: Power
- Status: Operational
- Construction began: 1975
- Opening date: 1978; 48 years ago
- Owner: Kenya Electricity Generating Company

Dam and spillways
- Type of dam: reservoir
- Impounds: Tana River
- Height: 30 m (98 ft)
- Length: 580 m (1,900 ft)
- Spillway capacity: 4,500 m^{3}/s (160,000 cu ft/s)

Reservoir
- Total capacity: 16,000,000 m^{3} (13,000 acre⋅ft)
- Normal elevation: 924 m (3,031 ft)

Gitaru Hydroelectric Power Station
- Coordinates: 00°47′43″S 37°45′09″E
- Operator: Kenya Electricity Generating Company
- Commission date: 1999 (Unit 3)
- Type: Run-of-the-river
- Hydraulic head: 136 m (446 ft)
- Turbines: 2 x 72 MW, 1 x 81 MW Francis-type
- Installed capacity: 225 MW (302,000 hp)

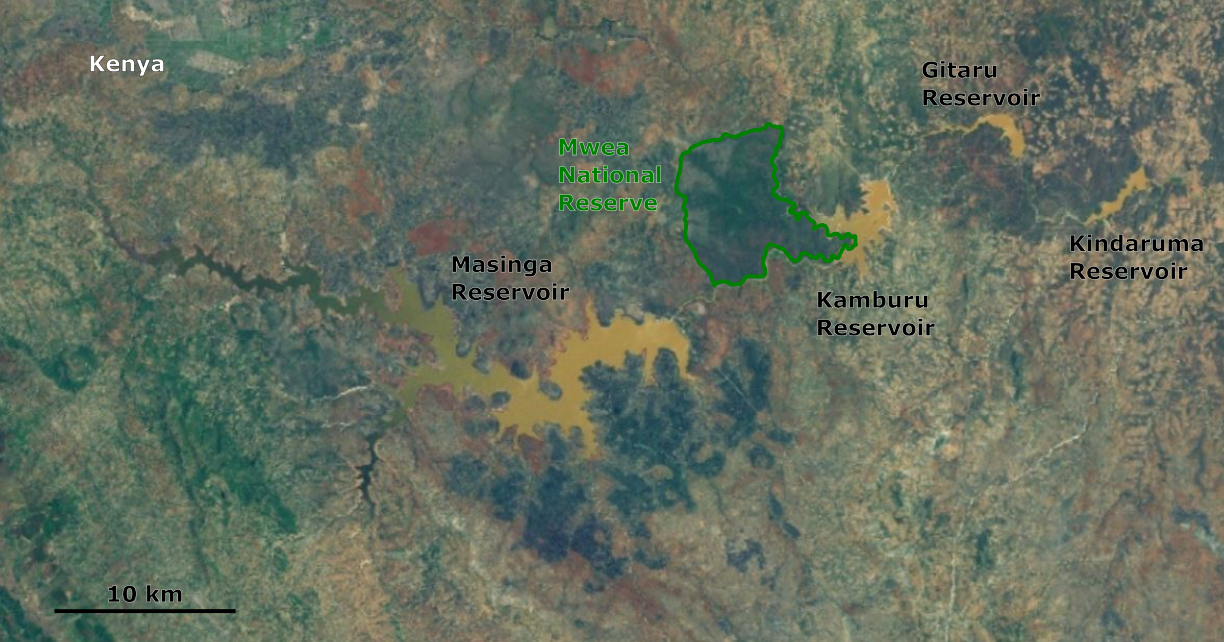
A view of various reservoirs at Upper Tana from Space

The Gitaru Hydroelectric Power Station, also known as the Gitaru Dam, is a rock and earth-filled embankment dam on the Tana River in Kenya. It straddles the border between Embu and Machakos Counties in the former Eastern Province. The primary purpose of the dam is hydroelectric power generation. It supports a 225 megawatt power station.

== Location ==
The power station is located approximately 16.5 kilometres (10 mi), by road, east of the town of Mavuria in Embu County. This is approximately 161 kilometres (100 mi), by road, northeast of Nairobi, Kenya's capital city. The geographical coordinates of Gitaru Power Station are:00°47'43.0"S, 37°45'09.0"E (Latitude:-0.795278; Longitude:37.752500).

== History ==
Construction of the dam began in 1975 and was completed in 1978. The third generating set, mobilizing the full potential of the power station was not commissioned until 1999. The World Bank lent US$63 million towards the development of this power station. The station is operated by the Kenya Electricity Generating Company and is part of the Seven Forks Scheme.

== Overview ==
The 30 m (98 ft) tall dam holds a 16,000,000 m^{3} (13,000 acre⋅ft) reservoir. The relatively small reservoir relies on steady releases from the Masinga and Kamburu Dams upstream. The reservoir power station is located underground near the left abutment and contains two 72 megawatt and one 81 megawatt Francis turbine-generators. Water released from the station is returned to the Tana at the Kindaruma Reservoir via a 4.7 km (2.9 mi) long tailrace tunnel. The difference in elevation between the reservoir and power station affords a net hydraulic head of 136 m (446 ft).

== See also ==
- Kamburu Hydroelectric Power Station – Upstream
- Kindaruma Hydroelectric Power Station – Downstream
- List of power stations in Kenya
