= Mochlus laeviceps =

Scientific classification
- Domain: Eukaryota
- Kingdom: Animalia
- Phylum: Chordata
- Class: Reptilia
- Order: Squamata
- Family: Scincidae
- Genus: Mochlus
- Species: M. laeviceps

Binomial name
- Mochlus laeviceps (Peters, 1874)

Synonyms
- Lygosoma laeviceps

Species of lizard

Mochlus laeviceps, the common writhing skink, is a species of skink found in Somalia and Ethiopia.
