= Mochlus somalicus =

Conservation status
- Least Concern (IUCN 3.1)

Scientific classification
- Kingdom: Animalia
- Phylum: Chordata
- Class: Reptilia
- Order: Squamata
- Suborder: Scinciformata
- Infraorder: Scincomorpha
- Family: Lygosomidae
- Genus: Mochlus
- Species: M. somalicus

Binomial name
- Mochlus somalicus (Parker, 1942)

Synonyms
- Riopa modesta somalica Parker, 1942; Lygosoma somalicum (Parker, 1942); Lygosoma sundevalli somalicum (Parker, 1942); Mochlus somalicum (Parker, 1942)

Species of lizard

Mochlus somalicus, also known as the Somali writhing skink, is a species of skink. It is found in Somalia, Ethiopia, Kenya, and Tanzania. It inhabits a variety of habitats, from coastal barren semi-desert to dry savanna to dense Acacia woodland at 1,700 m (5,600 ft) above sea level.
