= Mochlus brevicaudis =

Conservation status
- Least Concern (IUCN 3.1)

Scientific classification
- Kingdom: Animalia
- Phylum: Chordata
- Class: Reptilia
- Order: Squamata
- Family: Scincidae
- Genus: Mochlus
- Species: M. brevicaudis

Binomial name
- Mochlus brevicaudis (Greer, Grandison &, 1985)

Synonyms
- Lygosoma brevicaudis Greer, Grandison & Barbault, 1985

Species of lizard

Mochlus brevicaudis is a species of skink. It is found in West Africa, including Guinea, Ivory Coast, and Ghana, possibly extending into Togo. It is a semi-fossorial species inhabiting moist savanna.
