= Mochlus mocquardi =

Conservation status
- Least Concern (IUCN 3.1)

Scientific classification
- Kingdom: Animalia
- Phylum: Chordata
- Class: Reptilia
- Order: Squamata
- Family: Scincidae
- Genus: Mochlus
- Species: M. mocquardi

Binomial name
- Mochlus mocquardi (Chabanaud, 1917)

Synonyms
- Lygosoma (Riopa) mocquardi Chabanaud, 1917; Riopa mocquardi — M.A. Smith, 1937

Species of lizard

Mochlus mocquardi, also known commonly as Mocquard's writhing skink, is a species of lizard in the subfamily Lygosominae of the family Scincidae (skinks). The species is native to the Sahel region of Africa.

== Etymology ==
The specific name, mocquardi, is in honor of French Herpetologist François Mocquard.

== Geographic distribution ==
Mochlus mocquardi is found in West Africa (Niger, and Nigeria) and Chad, and according to the Reptile Database, also in Sudan.

== Behavior and habitat ==
Mochlus mocquardi is semi-fossorial and inhabits dry savanna in microhabitats with high humidity, such as under stones and in leaf litter within the shade of large trees, in lowland areas close to water.

== Reproduction ==
The mode of reproduction of Mochlus mocquardi is unknown.
