= Mochlus mabuiiformis =

Conservation status
- Data Deficient (IUCN 3.1)

Scientific classification
- Kingdom: Animalia
- Phylum: Chordata
- Class: Reptilia
- Order: Squamata
- Suborder: Scinciformata
- Infraorder: Scincomorpha
- Family: Lygosomidae
- Genus: Mochlus
- Species: M. mabuiiformis

Binomial name
- Mochlus mabuiiformis (Loveridge, 1935)

Synonyms
- Riopa mabuiiformis Loveridge, 1935; Lygosoma mabuiiforme (Loveridge, 1935); Lygosoma mabuiiformis (Loveridge, 1935)

Species of lizard

Mochlus mabuiiformis, also known as the mabuya-like writhing skink or mabuya-like skink, is a species of skink. This poorly known species is found in southern Somalia and north coastal Kenya.
