= Mochlus guineensis =

Conservation status
- Least Concern (IUCN 3.1)

Scientific classification
- Kingdom: Animalia
- Phylum: Chordata
- Class: Reptilia
- Order: Squamata
- Suborder: Scinciformata
- Infraorder: Scincomorpha
- Family: Lygosomidae
- Genus: Mochlus
- Species: M. guineensis

Binomial name
- Mochlus guineensis (Peters, 1879)

Synonyms
- Euprepes (Tiliqua) guineensis Peters, 1879; Riopa guineense — Smith, 1937; Lygosoma guineense — Greer et al., 1985; Euprepes chaperi Vaillant, 1884; Lygosoma chaperi — Hedges

Species of lizard

Mochlus guineensis, the Guinean forest skink, is a species of skink. It is found in southern West Africa and in Cameroon in the westernmost Central Africa, but possibly also further east. It occurs in savanna and farmbush habitats, including gallery forest and densely wooded humid savanna.
