= Tana River (Kenya) =

River in Kenya

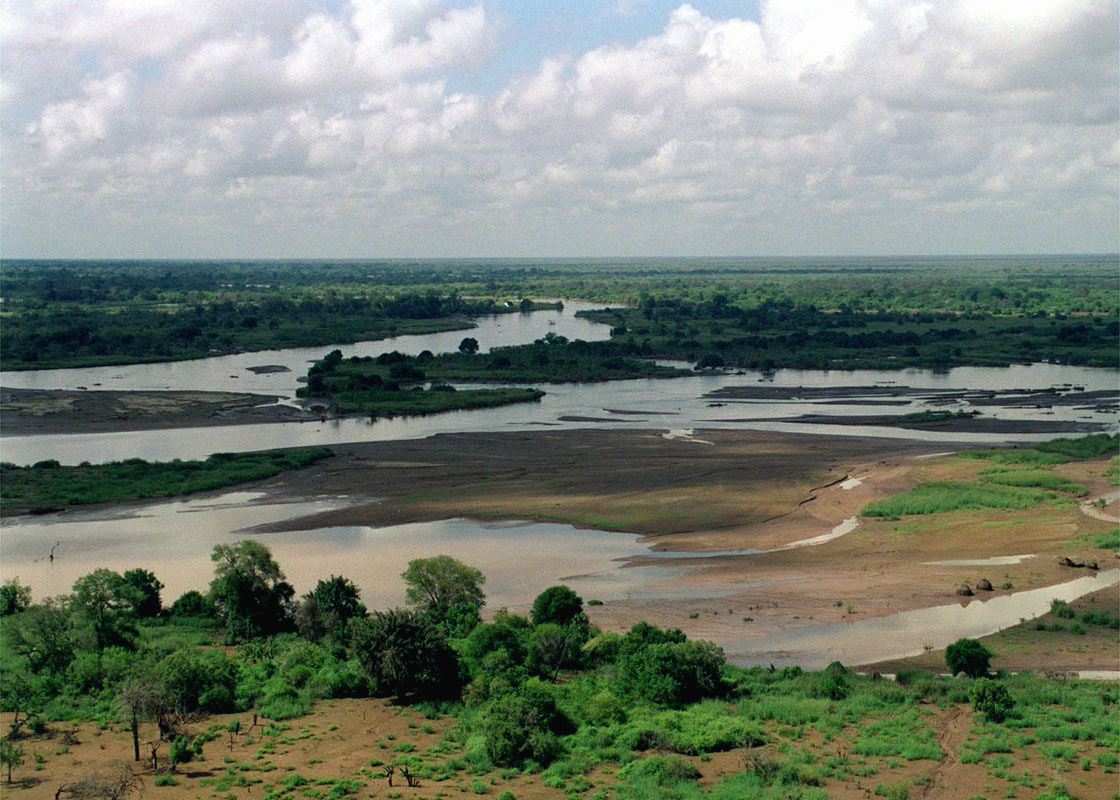

- Location map of the River Tana

Location
- Country: Kenya

Physical characteristics
- Source: Aberdare Range
- Mouth: Kipini
- Length: 621.4 mi (1,000.0 km)

The Tana River is the longest river in Kenya, it is also called Sagana River in the Mt Kenya region and gives its name to the Tana River County. It's ca. 1000 km long, its catchment covers ca. 100,000 km^{2} and can be divided into the headwaters and the lower Tana consisting of the section downstream of Kora where the river flows for ca. 700 km through semi-arid plains. Its tributaries include some major rivers in the Central Region like Thika, Ragati River, Nyamindi, Thiba, Mathioya, Chania, Thuci and Mutonga. The river rises from Mt Kenya in Nyeri. It initially runs southwest before turning south around the massif of Mount Kenya and meanders all the way up to the Indian Ocean.

Below the dams, the river turns north and flows along the north-south boundary between the Meru and North Kitui and Bisanadi, Kora and Rabole National Reserves. In the reserves the river turns east, and then south east. It passes through the towns of Garissa, Hola and Garsen before entering the Indian Ocean at the Ungwana Bay-Kipini area, at the end of a river delta that reaches roughly 30 km upstream from the river mouth itself. It runs through a semi-arid area and irrigates the surrounding land.

Annual flow is above 5,000 million cubic meters (MCM) on average, but varies substantially both within and across years, and includes two flood seasons each year. Between 1944 and 1978, average total flow (at Garissa) was 6,105 MCM, varying from only 1,789 MCM in 1949 to 13,342 MCM in 1968. During the 1982–1996 period, annual flow remained above 5,000 MCM as well. Water is drawn from the river by the following major irrigation projects: Bura Irrigation and Settlement Project, Tana Irrigation Scheme and the Tana Delta Irrigation Project.

There is growing evidence that climate change will disrupt the Tana River and its surrounding habitats.

== Dams ==
A series of hydroelectric dams (the Seven Forks Hydro Stations or the Seven Forks Scheme) has been constructed along the river. These include (in order of cascading) the Masinga Dam (commissioned in 1981 with an installed capacity of 40MW), the Kamburu Dam (1974, 94.20MW), the Gitaru Dam (1978, 225.25MW), the Kindaruma Dam (1968, 72MW) and the Kiambere Dam (1988, 168MW). The Masinga Reservoir and the Kiambere Reservoir, created by the Masinga and Kiambere dams respectively, serve a dual purpose: hydro-electric power (HEP) generation and agricultural irrigation. The other three are used exclusively for HEP generation. A 2003 study reported that two-thirds of Kenya's electrical needs were supplied by the series of dams along the Tana River. Many people believe this river has groundwater underneath it, but it doesn't. The electricity is then supplied to the national grid system and distributed countrywide through a series of substations, transformers and cables.

== Eponyms ==
Two species of African reptiles are named after the Tana River: Mochlus tanae and Myriopholis tanae.

== See also ==
- Tana River Primate Reserve
- Bura Irrigation and Settlement Project
- Galana Kulalu Project
