= Mochlus striatus =

Conservation status
- Least Concern (IUCN 3.1)

Scientific classification
- Kingdom: Animalia
- Phylum: Chordata
- Class: Reptilia
- Order: Squamata
- Suborder: Scinciformata
- Infraorder: Scincomorpha
- Family: Lygosomidae
- Genus: Mochlus
- Species: M. striatus

Binomial name
- Mochlus striatus (Hallowell, 1854)

Synonyms
- Euprepis striata Hallowell, 1854; Euprepes (Tiliqua) elegans Fischer, 1883 (preoccupied); Euprepes leoninus Fischer, 1884 (replacement name); Lepidothyris striatus – Wagner et al., 2009

Species of lizard

Mochlus striatus is a species of skink. It is endemic to Central Africa and found in Gabon, Cameroon, the Republic of Congo, and the Central African Republic. It inhabits rainforest areas, swamps, and coastal forests.

Mochlus striatus measure 137–167 mm (5.4–6.6 in) in snout–vent length.
