= Rukenya Dam =

Dam under construction in Kenya

Thiba / Rukenya Dam
- Interactive map of Thiba / Rukenya Dam
- Country: Kenya
- Location: Rukenya, Kirinyaga County
- Coordinates: 0°31′57″S 37°20′12″E

Dam and spillways
- Length: 1 km (0.62 mi)

The Rukenya Dam, also known as Thiba Dam, is a dam in Rukenya, Kirinyaga County, Kenya. As of January 2020, it is still under construction. The dam will be 40 meters (130 ft) high and 1 km wide, and its reservoir will occupy at least 542 acres of land, with a water storage capacity of 15 million cubic meters.

The dam’s primary purpose is to increase the land under irrigation in the Mwea Irrigation Scheme. The construction was informed by a study that proposed the rehabilitation and expansion of the irrigation scheme. The project will be funded by the Government of Kenya in partnership with the Japan International Cooperation Agency. The cabinet proposed the construction of the dam as a Vision 2030 project.

Construction began in September 2016, but was suspended in October 2019 due to a lack of funding. Works resumed in January 2020 thanks to a new $6 million release. The construction of the dam was completed in March 2022, following significant progress in addressing funding delays and land disputes that had temporarily stalled the project.
