= Kiambere Hydroelectric Power Station =

- Location within Kenya
- Country: Kenya
- Location: Kiambere, Embu County/Kitui County
- Coordinates: 00°48′38″S 37°48′46″E
- Purpose: Power
- Status: Operational
- Construction began: 1983
- Opening date: 1987; 39 years ago
- Owner: Kenya Electricity Generating Company

Dam and spillways
- Type of dam: Embankment, earth-fill
- Impounds: Tana River
- Height: 110 m (360 ft)
- Length: 1,000 m (3,300 ft)

Reservoir
- Total capacity: 585,000,000 m^{3} (474,000 acre⋅ft)

Kiambere Power Station
- Coordinates: 00°48′38″S 37°48′46″E
- Operator: Kenya Electricity Generating Company
- Commission date: 1988/2009
- Type: Conventional
- Hydraulic head: 150.5 m (494 ft)
- Turbines: 2 x 82.5 MW Francis-type
- Installed capacity: 165 MW (221,000 hp)

The Kiambere Hydroelectric Power Station is an earth-filled embankment dam on the Tana River near Kiambere, Kenya. It straddles the border of Embu and Kitui Counties in the former Eastern Province. The primary purpose of the dam is hydroelectric power generation and it supports a 165 MW power station. Construction on the dam began in 1983 and it was completed in 1987. The power station was commissioned in 1988. Beginning in 2008 both turbine-generators were upgraded from 72 MW to 82.5 MW. They were commissioned in 2009. US$95 million in funding for the original project was provided by the World Bank. The power station is operated by the Kenya Electricity Generating Company and is part of the Seven Forks Scheme.

The 110 m (360 ft) tall dam withholds a 585,000,000 m^{3} (474,000 acre⋅ft) reservoir with the assistance of another earth-fill saddle dam to the northwest. Water from an intake on the saddle dam travels through a 4,060 m (13,320 ft) headrace tunnel to the power station which is located underground. It contains two 82.5 MW Francis turbine-generators. Water released from the power station is returned to the Tana via a 1.4 km (0.87 mi) long tailrace tunnel. The difference in elevation between the reservoir and power station affords a hydraulic head of 150.5 m (494 ft).

== See also ==
- Kindaruma Dam – upstream
- List of power stations in Kenya
