= Mochlus hinkeli =

Conservation status
- Least Concern (IUCN 3.1)

Scientific classification
- Kingdom: Animalia
- Phylum: Chordata
- Class: Reptilia
- Order: Squamata
- Family: Scincidae
- Genus: Mochlus
- Species: M. hinkeli

Binomial name
- Mochlus hinkeli (Wagner, Böhme, Pauwels & Schmitz, 2009)

Synonyms
- Lepidothyris hinkeli Wagner, Böhme, Pauwels & Schmitz, 2009

Species of lizard

Mochlus hinkeli, also known commonly as Hinkel's red-flanked skink and Hinkel's red-sided skink, is a species of lizard in the family Scincidae. The species is native to eastern Central Africa and East Africa. There are two recognized subspecies.

== Etymology ==
The specific name, hinkeli, is in honor of German herpetologist Harald Hinkel.

== Geographic range ==
M. hinkeli is found in northern Angola, Burundi, the Democratic Republic of the Congo and the Republic of the Congo, western Kenya, Rwanda, Uganda, and Zambia.

== Habitat ==
The preferred natural habitat of M. hinkeli is forest.

== Description ==
M. hinkeli measures 76–146 mm (3.0–5.7 in) in snout-to-vent length (SVL).

== Behavior ==
M. hinkeli is terrestrial and diurnal.

== Reproduction ==
M. hinkeli is oviparous. Clutch size may be as many as 12 eggs.

== Subspecies ==
Two subspecies are recognized as being valid, including the nominotypical subspecies.

- Mochlus hinkeli hinkeli (Wagner et al., 2009)
- Mochlus hinkeli joei (Wagner et al., 2009)
