= Kamburu Dam =

- Location within Kenya
- Country: Kenya
- Location: Embu County/Machakos County, Eastern Province
- Coordinates: 0.8291°S 37.6679°E
- Purpose: Power
- Status: Operational
- Construction began: 1971
- Opening date: 1974; 52 years ago
- Construction cost: US$47 million
- Owner: Kenya Electricity Generating Company

Dam and spillways
- Type of dam: Embankment
- Impounds: Tana River
- Height: 52 m (171 ft)
- Length: 730 m (2,400 ft)

Reservoir
- Total capacity: 123,000,000 m^{3} (100,000 acre⋅ft)

Kamburu Power Station
- Operator: Kenya Electricity Generating Company
- Commission date: 1974
- Hydraulic head: 82 m (269 ft)
- Turbines: 3 x 31 MW Francis-type
- Installed capacity: 93 MW (125,000 hp)

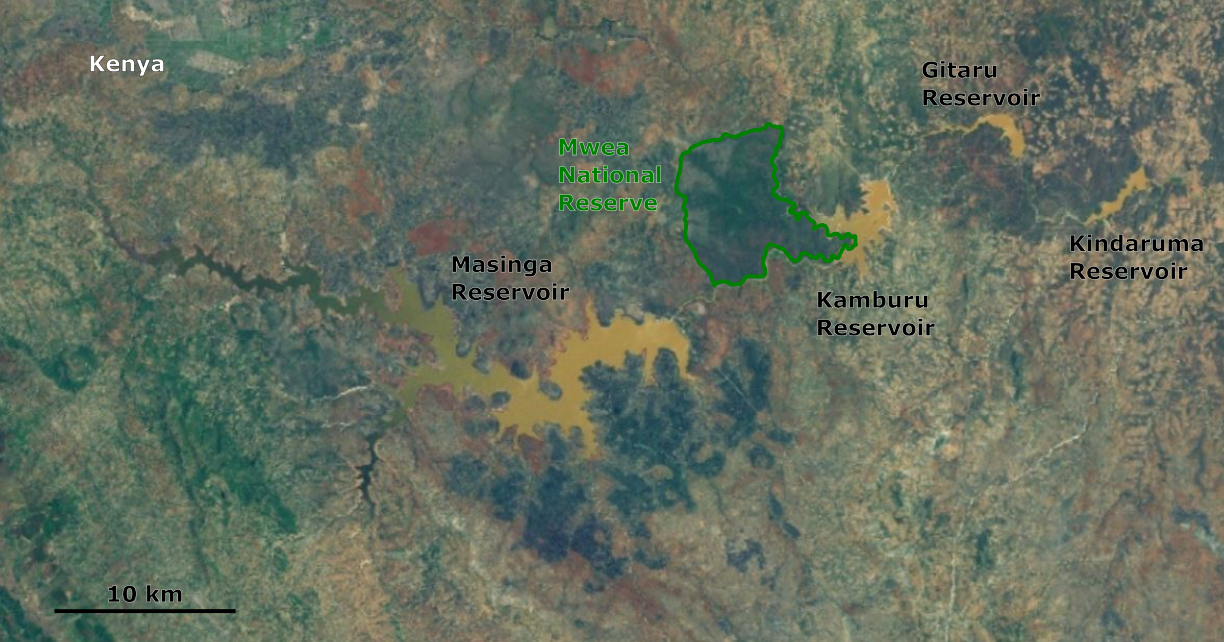
Reservoirs in upper Tana in Kenya from space

The Kamburu Hydroelectric Power Station, also Kamburu Dam is a rock-filled embankment dam on the Tana River in Kenya which straddles the border of Embu and Machakos Counties in Eastern Province. The primary purpose of the dam is hydroelectric power generation and it supports a 93 MW power station. Construction on the dam began in 1971 and it was completed in 1975, with the power station getting commissioned the same year. US$23 million of the US$47 million project cost was provided by the World Bank. The power station is operated by the Kenya Electricity Generating Company and is part of the Seven Forks Scheme.

The 52 m (171 ft) tall dam creates a reservoir with a storage capacity of 123,000,000 m^{3} (100,000 acre⋅ft). The power station is located underground just below the left toe and contains three 31 MW Francis turbine-generators. The difference in elevation between the reservoir and power station affords a net hydraulic head of 82 m (269 ft). Water discharged from the power station travels down a 3,040 m (9,970 ft) long tailrace tunnel before reaching the Tana at Gitaru Reservoir.

== See also ==
- Masinga Dam – upstream
- Gitaru Dam – downstream
- List of power stations in Kenya
- List of hydropower stations in Africa
