= Kenyatta University Solar Power Station =

Solar power plant under construction in Kenya

- Country: Kenya
- Location: Nairobi County
- Coordinates: 01°10′48″S 36°55′18″E
- Status: Under construction
- Construction began: 2017
- Commission date: 2020 expected
- Owner: Kenyatta University

Solar farm
- Type: Flat-panel PV

Power generation
- Nameplate capacity: 10 MW (13,000 hp)

Kenyatta University Solar Power Station is a 10 MW (13,000 hp) solar power plant under construction in Kenya.

== Location ==
The power station is located on the main campus of Kenyatta University, who own the power station. This is located along the Thika Highway, about 19 kilometres (12 mi), by road, north-east of the central business district of the city of Nairobi, Kenya's capital and largest city. The geographical coordinates of this power station are:1°10'48.0"S, 36°55'18.0"E (Latitude:-1.180000; Longitude:36.921667).

== Overview ==
The planned capacity of the power station, when completed, is 10 megawatts (13,000 hp). The power generated is expected to be consumed by the university, with the rest sold to Kenya Power and Lighting Company for integration into the national power grid. The first phase, of 100 kW, which was commissioned in December 2017, occupies 3 acres (1 ha).

== Construction timeline, costs, and funding ==
The first phase of the power station is 100 kilowatts (134 hp), and was built at a cost of KSh17 million (approx. US$167,000). The French solar panel manufacturer Urbasolar, supplied the solar panels with funding assistance from the government of France. The completed 10MW power station is budgeted at KSh1.7 billion (approx. US$16.7 million).

== See also ==
- List of power stations in Kenya
- Kenya Electricity Generating Company
- Kenya Electricity Transmission Company
