= Kindaruma Hydroelectric Power Station =

- Location within Kenya
- Country: Kenya
- Location: Embu County/Kitui County
- Coordinates: 00°48′38″S 37°48′46″E
- Purpose: Power
- Status: Operational
- Opening date: 1968; 58 years ago
- Owner: Kenya Electricity Generating Company

Dam and spillways
- Type of dam: Embankment
- Impounds: Tana River
- Height: 24 m (79 ft)
- Length: 549 m (1,801 ft)

Reservoir
- Creates: Kindaruma Lake
- Total capacity: 18,300,000 m^{3} (14,800 acre⋅ft)
- Surface area: 10 km^{2} (3.9 mi^{2})

Kindaruma Hydroelectric Power Station
- Coordinates: 00°48′38″S 37°48′46″E
- Operator: Kenya Electricity Generating Company
- Commission date: 1968/2012
- Turbines: 3 x 24 MW, 2 (Units 1 & 2) Kaplan-type & 1 (Unit 3) Fixed Blade Propeller Type
- Installed capacity: 72 MW (97,000 hp)

The Kindaruma Hydroelectric Power Station, also Kindaruma Dam is an embankment dam with two gravity dam sections on the Tana River in Kenya. It straddles the border of Embu and Machakos counties in Kenya. The primary purpose of the dam is hydroelectric power generation and it supports a 72 megawatts (97,000 hp) power station. It is Kenya's first post-independence hydroelectric power plant. It was commissioned in 1968 as part of the Seven Forks Scheme. The power station is operated by the Kenya Electricity Generating Company.

Between 2007 and 2013 the power station underwent a rehabilitation and upgrade which increased its installed capacity from 40 MW to 72 MW. In June 2012 a third Kaplan turbine-generator, rated at 24 MW, was commissioned. In January and June 2013, the original two 20 MW Kaplan turbine-generators were upgraded to 24 MW each.

== See also ==
- Gitaru Dam – upstream
- Kiambere Dam – downstream
- List of power stations in Kenya
- List of hydropower stations in Africa
