= Rumuruti Solar Power Station =

Solar power plant under development in Kenya

Rumuturi Solar Power Station
- Country: Kenya
- Location: Rumuruti, Laikipia County
- Coordinates: 00°14′12″N 36°32′49″E
- Status: Under construction
- Construction began: January 2020 (Expected)
- Commission date: December (Expected)
- Construction cost: US$60 million
- Operator: Rumuruti Solar Generation Holding

Solar farm
- Type: Flat-panel PV

Power generation
- Nameplate capacity: 40 MW (54,000 hp)

The Rumuruti Solar Power Station is a 40 MW (54,000 hp) solar power plant under development in Kenya.

== Location ==
The site of the under-construction power station is located in the town of Rumuruti, the county headquarters of Laikipia County, approximately 230 kilometres (143 mi), by road, north of Nairobi, the capital and largest city of Kenya. The government of Laikipia County has provided 300 acres (121 ha), on which the power station will be built.

== Overview ==
In June 2018, Kenergy Renewalables Limited, a Kenyan solar energy company, signed a sales agreement with the Kenyan government for sale of 40 megawatts of electricity for a 20-year contract period. Kenya Power and Lighting Company, the Kenyan electricity distribution company, would pay US$0.08 per kilowatt hour for the 20-year duration of the contract.

== Developers ==
The developers of this power station include: (a) Kenergy Renewables Limited, a Kenyan company founded in 2011, that manages development activities before and during construction, including permitting, procurement, engineering and financing (b) Norfund, the Norwegian Fund for Developing Countries and (c) Scatec Solar, a solar products manufacturer based in Norway.

The three investors in the project formed a special purpose vehicle company to develop, construct, and operate the solar power station. The SPV company is called Rumuruti Solar Generation Holding. The SPV company is registered in the United Kingdom with the ownership illustrated in the table below:

Rumuruti Solar Generation Holding Stock Ownership
Rank	Name of Owner	Country	Percentage Ownership
1	Kenergy Renewables Limited	Kenya	
2	Norfund	Norway	
3	Scatec Solar	Norway	
	Total		100.00

In August 2020, Afrik21.africa reported that Scatec and Norfund, both from Norway, withdrew from the project, because "the development timelines were too long".

== Construction costs and funding ==
It is estimated that construction will cost at least US$60 million, and possibly as high as US$70 million. The majority of the construction costs are expected to be borrowed. The company owner/developers requested a "letter of support" from the government which will provide clarity on when the plant will become operational, to convince potential lenders to loan the money.

In October 2019, the governor of Laikipia County, Ndiritu Muriithi and the chief executive officer of Kenergy Renewables, Ms. Khilna Dodhia signed a memorandum of understanding (MoU) that will govern the construction of this power station. Construction is expected to start at the beginning of 2020, and last 10 months.

== See also ==
- List of power stations in Kenya
