= Mukurumudzi Dam =

Coordinates: 4.3844°S 39.45°E

- Interactive map of Mukurumudzi Dam
- Country: Kenya
- Location: Mombasa
- Purpose: Primary water source for the Kwale Mineral Sands Project
- Construction began: January 2012
- Opening date: August 2013
- Operator: Base Resources

Dam and spillways
- Type of dam: Homogeneous earthfill dam
- Height (thalweg): 24m
- Length: 347 m (1,138 ft)
- Dam volume: 200,000 cubic metres

The Mukurumudzi Dam is the primary water source for the Kwale Mineral Sands Project which mines titanium and zircon minerals from the dunes in the area south of Mombasa, Kenya. The Kwale Project is operated by the Australian mining company, Base Resources, and is located 10 kilometres inland from the Kenyan coast and 50 kilometres south of Mombasa, Kenya's principal port facility.

Design and construction management for the dam was undertaken by Wave International Pty Ltd in association with ARQ. Construction of the dam started in January 2012 with completion in August 2013, and was undertaken by a local Kenya Civil Contractor, Hayer Bishan Singh & Sons Ltd.

== Design ==
The Mukurumudzi Dam is a 24m high homogeneous earthfill dam, with a low permeability central core and cut-off key and grout curtain, to limit seepage under the dam. The outlet works comprise a reinforced concrete intake tower and a reinforced concrete draw-off culvert and associated pipe work.

The dam embankment consists of 200,000 cubic metres (7,100,000 cu ft) of silty-sand originating from the local area. Due to a lack of suitable clay materials in the area, an impermeable central bentonite-cement-soil cut-off membrane was constructed successively with the embankment. The spillway discharges into the Mukurumudzi River. It is located on the left flank with a 65 m (213 ft) wide, uncontrolled concrete overflow, ogee spillway crest and spillway channel lined with reinforced concrete for the first 40 m (130 ft). The dam impounds some 8.4 x 106 m³ at full supply level and has a catchment area of 133 km².

The maximum water level is set at 58 metres (190 ft) above sea level and the top of the dam embankment wall is at 61.2 metres (201 ft) above sea level which gives a dam wall height of 22 m (72 ft), a wall length of 347 metres (1,138 ft) and a maximum contained volume of 8.8 gigalitres (310,000,000 cu ft). The dam supply is supplemented from the Gongoni borefield when water levels drop below 6,000,000 cubic metres (210,000,000 cu ft).
