= Thika Dam =

Dam in Kenya

Ndakaini Dam
- Location within Kenya
- Country: Kenya
- Coordinates: 0°49′13″S 36°51′01″E
- Status: Operational
- Construction began: 1989
- Opening date: 1994
- Construction cost: 20m Kenyan Shillings
- Owner: Athi Water Services Board

Dam and spillways
- Type of dam: Embankment, earth-fill
- Height: 63 m (207 ft)
- Length: 458 m (1,503 ft)
- Dam volume: 2,340,000 m^{3}
- Spillway capacity: 390 m^{3}/s

Reservoir
- Total capacity: 70,000,000 m^{3} (56,750 acre⋅ft)
- Inactive capacity: 1,000,000 m^{3} (811 acre⋅ft)
- Catchment area: 75 km^{2}
- Surface area: 280 ha

The Ndakaini dam is a 63 m high, 458 m crest length earthfill dam on the Thika River near the small town of Ndakaini, 50 km north of Nairobi, Kenya. The reservoir has a storage capacity of 70 million cubic metres and serves for drinking water supply. Water is treated at the Ngethu treatment works. The dam has increased the reliability of water supply to Nairobi, which suffered water shortages during the dry season before construction of the dam was completed in 1994. The dam has been financed by the African Development Bank, the World Bank, the European Investment Bank and the Kenyan government. Its construction had been delayed because of difficulties in land acquisition, leading to cost overruns. During construction the dam design has been modified to allow it to withstand a 1:10,000-year flood and to improve dam safety.
