= Masinga Hydroelectric Power Station =

- Location within Kenya
- Official name: Masinga Power Station
- Country: Kenya
- Location: Embu County/Machakos County, Eastern Province
- Coordinates: 00°53′21″S 37°35′40″E
- Purpose: Power
- Status: Operational
- Construction began: 1978
- Opening date: 1981
- Owners: Tana and Athi River Development Authority

Dam and spillways
- Type of dam: Embankment dam
- Impounds: Tana River
- Height: 60 m (200 ft)
- Length: 2,200 m (7,200 ft)
- Dam volume: 4,950,000 m^{3} (175,000,000 cu ft)
- Spillway type: Over the dam

Reservoir
- Total capacity: 1,560,000,000 m^{3} (1,260,000 acre⋅ft)
- Surface area: 120 km^{2} (46 mi^{2})

Power Station
- Operator: Kenya Electricity Generating Company
- Commission date: 1981
- Hydraulic head: 49 m (161 ft) (max)
- Turbines: 2 x 20 MW Kaplan-type
- Installed capacity: 40 megawatts (54,000 hp)
- Annual generation: 129 - 232 GWh

Masinga Hydroelectric Power Station, also Masinga Dam, is an embankment dam on the Tana River, the longest river in Kenya and straddles the border of Embu and Machakos Counties in Eastern Province and is located about 106 km. (66 mi.), by road, northeast of Nairobi, Kenya's capital and largest city. Construction of the dam began in 1978, and was completed in 1981. It is owned by Tana and Athi Rivers Development Authority (TARDA). The dam is used for power production and is part of the Seven Forks Scheme.

== Dam ==
Masinga Dam is a 60 m tall and 2,200 m long embankment dam with a volume of 4,950,000 m³. The dam contains a spillway and a bottom outlet.

== Reservoir ==
At full reservoir level (maximum flood level of 1,056.5 m) the reservoir of the dam has a surface area of 120 km² and its total capacity is 1,56 billion m³. Minimum operating level is normally 1,037 m. On June 26, KenGen shut down the power plant because the operating level had fallen to 1,035.5 m. At the time of the closure the plant had been producing 14 MW.

Because of its large volume, the reservoir is crucial in regulating the flow of water for the other 4 hydroelectric power plants downstream.

== Power plant ==
The run-of-the-river hydroelectric power plant went operational in 1981. It is owned and operated by Kenya Electricity Generating Company (KenGen). The plant has a nameplate capacity of 40 MW. Its average annual generation is between 128 (in 2008) and 232 (in 2007) GWh, depending on the water flow of the Tana River.

The power plant contains 2 Kaplan turbine-generators with 20 MW each. The turbines were provided by Escher Wyss, the generators by ABB. The maximum hydraulic head is 49 m, maximum flow per turbine is 45.9 (45) m³/s.

== History ==
Capital cost of the dam was US$172 million.

Feasibility studies were made in the 1970s and they confirmed the viability of a cascade of hydroelectric power plants along the Tana River: Masinga, Kamburu, Gitaru, Kindaruma, Kiambere, Karura, Mutonga, Low Grand Falls, Usheni, Adamsons Falls, and Kora. Only the first five of them have been built so far.

Plans to raise the dam by 1.5 m in order to increase the volume of the reservoir up to 2 billion m³ were finally cancelled. The cost would have been US$15 million.

In February 2018, KenGen resurrected plans to raise the Masinga Dam wall by 2 metres (6.6 ft), and install pumping equipment to recycle the downstream water discharge back to the dam for steady electricity output though the dry seasons. The French Development Agency (AFD) agreed to lend the KSh21 million (€169,000) required to conduct a fresh feasibility and environment impact assessment. AFD selected EDF Group, a French company to carry out the study.

Heavy rains beginning in March 2018 led to major flooding throughout the Tana River area. On 17 May 2018, it was announced that the Masinga dam had reached capacity and had begun to overflow one week after the deadly failure of a smaller embankment dam in Solai. While safeguards in place prevented the dam from failing, other dams downstream had already reached capacity and authorities advised the evacuation of the towns of Garissa, Garsen, Hola, and Bura.

== See also ==
- Kamburu Hydroelectric Power Station – downstream
- List of power stations in Kenya
