= Benedetto Lanza =

Benedetto Lanza (May 24, 1924, Florence – March 10, 2016, Florence) was an Italian herpetologist and chiropterologist. He published over 500 works, with the first one being published in 1946. He described 68 new taxa. He was Professor of Biology and Director of the Natural History Museum at the Università degli Studi di Firenze.

== Taxon described by him ==
- See Category:Taxa named by Benedetto Lanza

== Taxon named in his honor ==
- The lizard Agama lanzai Wagner, Leaché, Mazuch & Böhme, 2013
- Lanza's alpine salamander or the large alpine salamander Salamandra lanzai Nascetti, Andreone, Capula & Bullini, 1988
- Lanza's skink Chalcides lanzai G. Pasteur, 1967
- The lizard Latastia longicaudata lanzai Arillo, Balletto & Spanó, 1967
- The bat species Socotran or Lanza's pipistrelle Hypsugo lanzai Benda, Al-Jumaily, Reiter & Nasher, 2011
