= Somali Bantus =

Meta-ethnic group located in Somalia

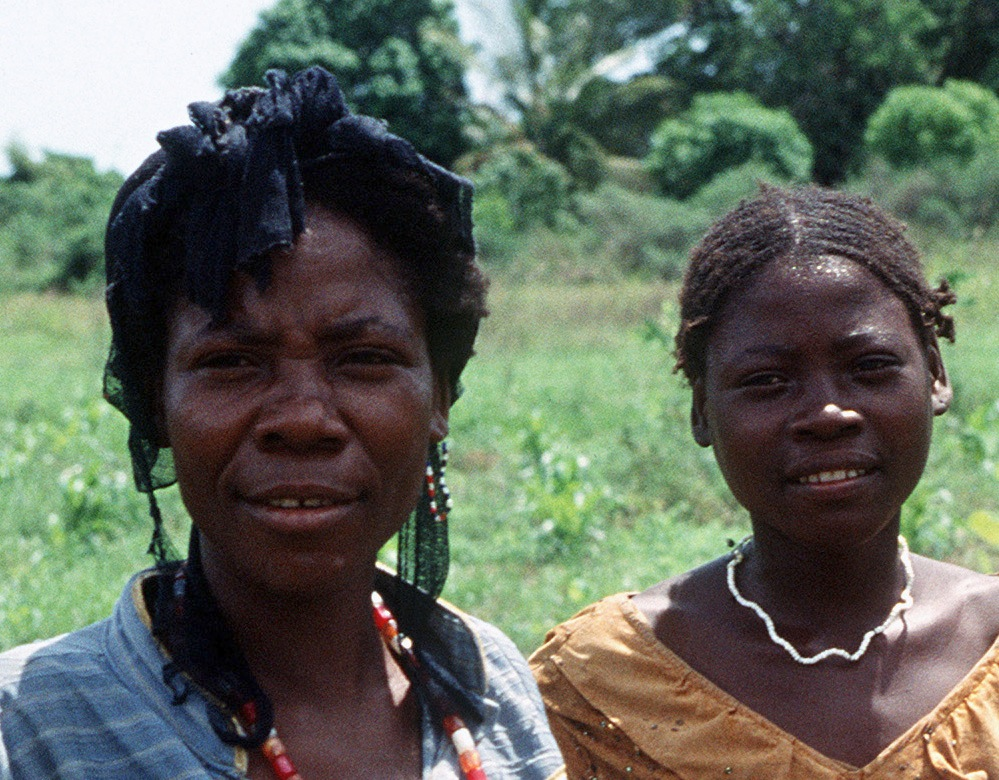
- Bantu farmers near Kismayo (2003)

Total population
- 900,000 (2003)–1,500,000 (2025)

Regions with significant populations
- Southern Somalia, Kenya, and Tanzania
- Somalia: 1,500,000 (2025)
- United States: 12,000 (2004)
- Tanzania: 3,000 (2003)
- Kenya: 685 (2019)

Languages
- Mushunguli, Swahili, other Bantu languages, and Somali primarily the Maay dialect (through acculturation and ongoing language shift)

Religion
- Islam

Related ethnic groups
- Other Bantus, especially the Majindo, Makua, Nyasa, Yao, Zaramo, and Zigua

The Somali Bantus (also known as Jareer, meaning "hard hair", Jareerweyne, or WaGosha, meaning "people of the forest") are a Bantu ethnic minority group in Somalia who primarily reside in the southern part of the country, near the Jubba and Shabelle rivers. The Somali Bantus arrived in Somalia during the 19th century Somali slave trade from a variety of cultural groups originating in present-day Tanzania and Mozambique, settled in agricultural communities in Somalia, integrated into the Somali clan system, accepted Islam, adopted a local dialect of Somali, all while they perpetuated various non-Somali cultural practices from their pre-slavery past.

An overseas diaspora community of Somali Bantus can be found primarily in the United States. Cultural assimilation into mainstream Somali society tends to be stronger for Somali Bantus living in urban areas and the Shebelle region, while Bantu linguistic and cultural traditions tend to be stronger in Somali Bantus of the Juba region. Politically, the Somali Bantu of different tribes form ethnic alliances in the parliament of Somalia. The Somali Bantu are not to be confused with the members of Swahili society of Somalia in coastal centers, such as the Bajuni or the Bravanese, who speak dialects of the Swahili language but have a culture, tradition, and history separate of the Somali Bantu.

According to a BBC news report in June 2003, the number of Somali Bantu in Somalia was estimated to be around 900,000, mainly concentrated in the south along the Jubba river. In February 2025, MEDA estimated that the Bantu/Jareer numbered around 1 to 1.5 million people, mostly concentrated in the Lower Shabelle, Jubaland, and Bay regions. However, according to Ken Menkhaus, no reliable census figures existed and population estimates by tribe or ethnic group were often unreliable and subject to gross exaggeration for political purposes. He instead estimated the Somali Bantu population in 2003 at approximately 350,000 people, or about 5% of Somalia's population at the time. Somalia has not conducted a national census since 1975, and subsequent population data are largely based on estimates due to the absence of functioning nationwide statistical infrastructure. Previous census data are still used with adjustments, even though they are becoming increasingly outdated and obsolete.

== Terminology ==
Various terms differentiating the Somali Bantu from ethnic Somalis have been in usage for a long time. According to the scholar Ken Menkhaus, the collective label "Somali Bantu" did not exist before 1991. The term "Somali Bantu" is an exonym that was created by humanitarian agencies shortly after the outbreak of the civil war in Somalia in 1991. Its purpose was to help staff of these aid agencies better distinguish between, on the one hand, Bantu origin ethnic minority groups hailing from Southern Somalia and thus in dire need of humanitarian attention and on the other hand, other Bantu groups from elsewhere in Africa that did not require immediate humanitarian assistance. The neologism further spread through the media, which repeated verbatim what the aid agencies increasingly began indicating in their reports as a new name for Somalia's ethnically Bantu minorities. Prior to the civil war, the Bantu were referred to in the literature as Bantu, Gosha, or Jareer, terms which they are still commonly called within Somalia proper. International aid agencies, UN peacekeepers, and the media unintentionaly played a critical unintended role in identity formation among the Somali Bantu.

Francesca Declich writes that in refugee camps, Somali Bantu were identified as a distinct group from other Somali refugees in order to ensure that they received humanitarian assistance. Aid workers reported that, because of longstanding discrimination and their marginalized status, Somali Bantu refugees were particularly vulnerable to having their food and aid looted. According to her, the designation of Somali Bantu, which became widespread after 1990, helped humanitarian organizations recognize them as a vulnerable population and direct assistance toward them. The label "Bantu" gained prominence in refugee camps after 1990 as a humanitarian category used to distinguish marginalized communities that did not belong to the dominant Somali patrilineal clans. Although those grouped under the label had not previously identified themselves collectively as "Bantu", the designation enabled aid agencies to recognize them as a vulnerable minority. The shared experience of displacement and refugee life also contributed to the development of a broader collective identity among these communities.

According to the scholar Annette Wannamaker:

"The designation of Somali Bantu is a recent one, created within the international refugee administrative systems following the displacement of many self-contained rural communities during the political upheavals in Somalia in the early 1990s."

The Somali Bantu called themselves waGosha, meaning people of the forest. While the Somalis call them the Jareer, meaning hard hair, or JareerWeyn, meaning greater Jareer.

== History ==
=== Origins and the Somali slave trade ===
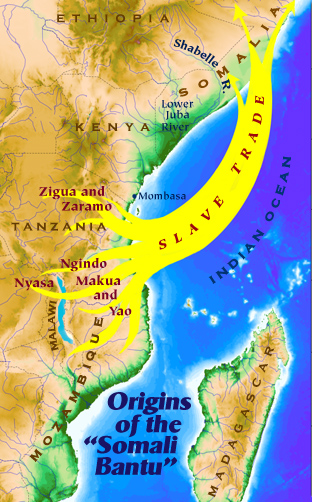
Map showing the ancestral roots of the Somali Bantu peoples

The Somali Bantu trace their origins to the Somali slave trade. In the 19th century, the growing demand for agricultural produce in the Arabian Peninsula drove Somalis to expand farming, however labor shortages in southern Somalia left much fertile land uncultivated, leading Somalis to purchase Bantu slaves from Zanzibar to supply the necessary labor. Bantu slaves were made to work in plantations owned by Somalis along the Shebelle and Jubba rivers, harvesting lucrative cash crops such as grain and cotton. According to Catherine Besteman, the maritime trade in Bantu slaves to Somalia expanded significantly during the early 19th century. Lee Cassanelli traced some of the earliest documented imports to the year 1800, when slaves from Tanzania were brought to Barawa. In 1833, the British naval officer W.F.W. Owens reported that Mogadishu imported slaves, while Lieutenant William Christopher observed slaves working in large numbers around Barawa, Marka, and Mogadishu during his 1843 expedition. Esmond Bradley Martin writes that the Banadir coast was a major destination for enslaved people imported from East Africa during the 19th century. Many Bantu slaves were acquired by Somali traders through Lamu and transported to southern Somalia, where slave labor contributed to the expansion of agriculture along the Shabelle river. The trade declined in the 1890s following British control of the Lamu archipelago. According to Luigi Robecchi, the Tunni Somalis owned many plantation slaves. The majority of farmers along the Shabelle who employed slave labour were Cushitic Somalis rather than Arabs.

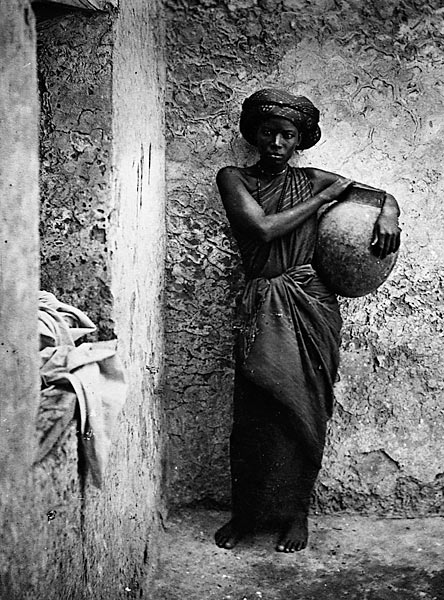
A Bantu servant woman in Mogadishu (1882–1883)

In the words of Chiesi (1909):

"Most of the slaves who arrived in the Benadir, either by sea or by land, were destined for the plantations along the river and the irrigation canals, in the so-called sciambe (shambas); many remained in coastal localities in the service of Arab, Hameran, and Somali notables and merchants, who, out of racial pride and religious superstition, avoided all manual labour, which they considered humiliating and contemptible."

While traveling through the Somali country in 1900, Colonel Harald George Carlos Swayne met some of these Bantu slaves:

"On the Webbe Shabeleh, a river race called the Adone, also negroes, were working in the fields and punting rafts on the river for their masters, the Somalis."

According to Lee Cassanelli, a runaway slave named Salemi reported that he and about forty companions were captured on the Mrima coast of present-day Tanzania by Omani-Arab traders and transported to southern Somalia through the port of Merka. Bantu oral traditions maintain that many Wazigwa migrated from present-day Tanzania during periods of famine and drought, but were deceived into slavery upon arrival. Scholars believe that the Wazigwa may have entered slavery voluntarily as a result of severe persistent droughts that plagued Tanzania in the 19th century. They were subsequently sold in Somalia to meet the growing demand for plantation labor. Somalis owned slaves for agricultural labor, as many Somalis traditionally viewed farming with disdain and relied on slave labor to cultivate the land. Bantu slaves were often overworked, underfed, and housed in poor conditions.

From 1800 to 1890, between 25,000–50,000 Bantu slaves are thought to have been sold from the slave market of Zanzibar to the Somali coast. Most of the slaves were taken from the Majindo, Makua, Nyasa, Yao, Zaramo and Zigua ethnic groups of Tanzania, Mozambique, and Malawi. Collectively, these Bantu groups are known as Mushunguli, a term taken from the Zigua tribe’s word for people.

=== Other Origin theories ===
Alternative theories suggest that some Somali Bantu tribes migrated to the riverine parts of southern Somalia as agriculturalists taking part in the millennia long ongoing Bantu expansion. This theory has been based largely on an Arabic manuscript, the Kitab al-Zanj, which mentions the existence of a group of Blacks (Zanj) settled around the Jubba River. The Kitab al-Zanj is not known from any manuscript predating the 20th century, and its historical reliability has been questioned by scholars. According to Neville Chittick, the accounts in the Kitab al-Zanj must be given up as mythical. Scholars argue that linguistic evidence suggests that Bantu-speaking populations were not among the region’s earliest inhabitants, contrary to the view expressed by I.M. Lewis. Linguistic studies of Somali dialects and certain Bantu languages have found no evidence of shared phonological developments or other systematic structural similarities, suggesting a lack of long-term linguistic contact.

Additionally, according to the scholar Esmond Bradley Martin, there is little evidence of Bantu-speaking communities along the Jubba and Shabelle rivers before 19th century. Increased slave imports to the Banadir coast in the 1800s led to the emergence of Bantu communities of escaped slaves mainly on the Jubba river. The major growth of the fugitive slave population began after 1841. According to Turton (1975), there is no reliable evidence that Bantu-speaking populations inhabited Somalia in the distant past, as neither archaeological nor linguistic research has produced conclusive support for such a view. The Somali scholar Ali Jimcale Ahmed adds that there is no reliable evidence for a significant Bantu presence in southern Somalia prior to the 19th century, and maintains that the ancestors of the Somali Bantu arrived primarily through the slave trade.

=== Runaway slaves and the creation of the WaGosha ===
According to Bantu oral traditions, harsh treatment under slavery contributed to a rebellion led by a woman named Wanakucha. Seeking to return to their homelands in Tanzania and Mozambique, the rebels instead settled in the Gosha region along the Jubba River, where they cleared forests and established farming communities. During the Somali independence movement of the 1940s, the Gosha Bantu supported anti-colonial efforts against Italian rule. Their leader, Nasib Bundo, was arrested by the Italian authorities and later died in prison.

Around 1829, large numbers of Zigua from present-day Tanzania were enslaved and transported to the Banadir coast via Zanzibar and Lamu. By 1844, many had escaped and established settlements along the Jubba River. 19th century travelers described these communities as fortified agricultural settlements populated by former slaves from various Bantu groups. They cultivated crops, traded with neighboring Somalis, and grew through the arrival of additional runaway slaves. By 1891, the Gosha population was estimated at 30,000-40,000, and by the early 20th century many had become increasingly integrated into Somali society and adopted the Somali language. Although these communities later became known as the WaGosha, meaning the people of the forest, the term itself does not appear before the 1870s, when Nasib Bundo, a freed slave, proclaimed himself Sultan of the WaGosha. One of the most prominent events in Gosha history was the defeat of a major Ogaden attack around 1890, an event preserved in Gosha oral traditions. The victory is largely attributed to Nasib Bundo, a Yao former slave who emerged as a leading Gosha figure and was known as the "Sultan of the Gosha." Under his leadership, a loose Gosha confederacy developed, while relations with neighboring Ogaden communities were characterized by both trade and periodic conflict. At times, Nasib Bundo made agreements with certain Somali clans to return escaped slaves to their owners, namely the Bimal, who were heavily dependent on slave labour for cultivation. In the early 1870s, Gosha villagers were able to band together to defeat and subordinate the neighboring Boni to whom they had initially been forced to pay tribute, a victory achieved with the use of guns acquired from the sultan of Zanzibar in exchange for the promise of a share of ivory to the sultan. By the late 19th century, Somali proselytisers were successfully spreading Islam among the Gosha.

=== Colonialism and the end of slavery ===
The abolition of slavery in Italian Somaliland was carried out through a series of decrees issued between 1897 and 1907. Some Bantu communities remained enslaved until the 1910s in regions beyond effective Italian control.

In the 1930s, the Italians reported to the Advisory Committee of Experts on Slavery that slavery and slave trade in Somalia had now been abolished. Although the Italians freed some Bantus, some Bantu groups remained enslaved well into the 1930s and continued to be despised and discriminated against by large parts of Somali society. By 1935, the Italians in collaboration with former Somali slave owners introduced coerced labor laws and the forced conscription of the freed slaves in the agricultural industry, with over 100 Italian plantations in the river valleys. The emancipated Bantu were forced to leave their own farms to work solely as farm laborers on plantations owned by the Italian colonial government. In 1937, a law was passed that allowed Italians to keep enslaved concubines. The Italians definitionally separated the ex-slave population from the Somali population for purposes of conscripting laborers. According to Kenyan historian Ahmed Salim, Somali men generally avoided plantation labour due to an aversion to manual labour. During the fascist period, Italian authorities relied on forced labour, as Somali workers were not attracted by monetary wages, which were not yet seen as useful for meeting daily subsistence needs. According to Harold Nelson, during the Italian colonial period the potential labour market was largely composed of sedentary populations who had formerly been enslaved by dominant Somali groups, who showed little interest in agriculture. Almost all the people conscripted into these forced plantations were former slaves or related to former slaves. The colonial government tasked ethnic Somalis with drafting these former slaves under their control to work on plantations. Several demonstrations against conscription took place and many conscripted men fled the estates. As a result, the Italians promised men conscripted into forced labor the right to choose any woman on the plantation as a wife, without her consent. Contemporary informants reported that without the company of a woman, most young men would have fled conscription.

Abuses against conscripts on plantations under the fascist administration were common, as many of the Italians sent to Somalia were violent or corrupt individuals with criminal records. In one documented case, workers who failed to complete assigned labor were punished by being tied to a pole and exposed to the sun for hours. Among descendants of slaves in Somalia, memories of forced labor under the fascist regime often overshadowed earlier memories of slavery in southern Somalia. In local recollections, traumatic memories associated with slavery were largely linked to forced conscriptions in the fascist period. At an Italian-owned plantation known as Avai, numerous Bantu laborers were drowned in the irrigation canals.

The British abolished this system after defeating the Italians in WW2. One British official described the scheme to be indistinguishable from slavery.

== Contemporary situation ==
=== Profile ===
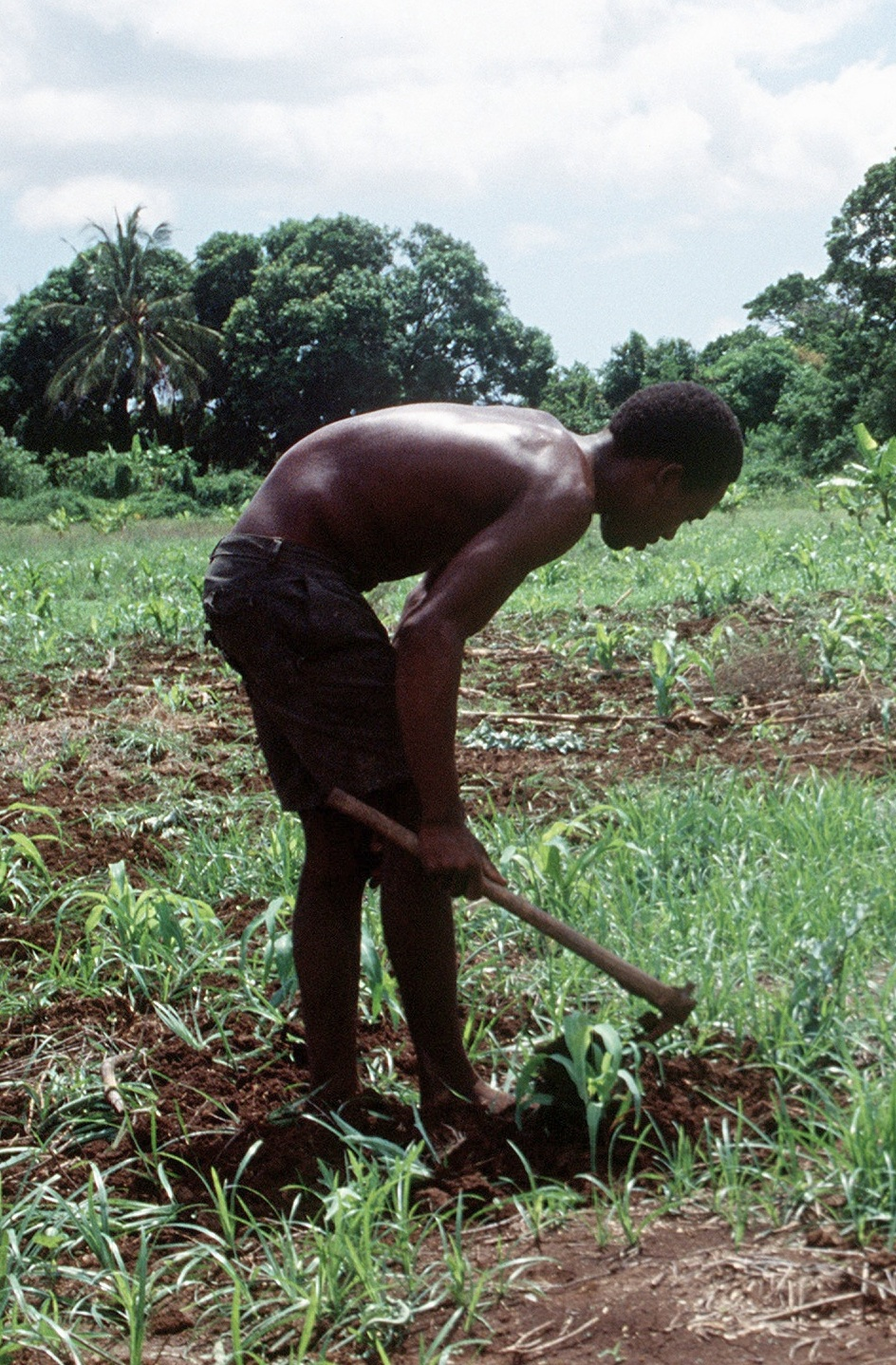
A Bantu man working in the fields

The Somali Bantu are known as WaGosha (translating to people of the forest), Jareer, or Mushunguli. Many now identify simply as Bantu, while others use names reflecting their East African origins, such as Zigua. Historical terms for the community include Shanbara and Shangama. The term Mushunguli may derive from the Zigua ethnonym Mzigua. Somalis have historically been primarily pastoral nomads, while the Somali Bantu have traditionally been sedentary agriculturalists engaged in farming along riverine areas. The Somali Bantus' predominant physical traits also serve to further distinguish them from Somalis. Among these phenotypic characteristics of the Bantu are kinky (jareer) hair, while Somalis are soft-haired (jilec). According to Somali Bantu writer Omar Eno, the Somali Bantu have faced discrimination due to their distinct physical appearance and ethnic background, and have often been excluded from political, economic, and educational opportunities. Bantu populations maintain ancestral tribal identities linked to their East African origins. In contrast to the ethnic Somalis, for whom clan affiliation is central to social and political organization, many Bantu communities identify more strongly with their place of residence. In 1994, it was reported that although some Somalis farmed, farming was mostly a Bantu occupation.

The majority of Somali Bantus have converted to Islam, which they first began embracing to free themselves from slavery, as Muslims could not be slaves of other Muslims. Additionally, whether Muslim or many Bantu have retained their ancestral animist traditions, including the practice of possession dances and the use of magic. Many of these religious traditions closely resemble those practised in Tanzania, similarities which also extend to hunting, harvesting and music, among other things. Since Islam is the predominant religion among the Somali Bantu, they celebrate Eid al-Fitr and Eid al-Adha. While traditional Bantu rituals and dances continue in some contexts alongside Islamic practices, conversion to Islam has been noted as contributing to reduced tensions with neighboring Somali communities. Early refugee reports indicate no Christians among Somali Bantu arriving in camps in 1992, though by 1996 a small number had converted to Christianity in the Ifo refugee camp where Ethiopian Christians also lived. A 2002 International Organization for Migration report also notes the presence of a Bantu-constructed Christian church in the same camp. Somali Muslims have regarded Somali Bantu religious saints and Sufi-influenced practices as unorthodox due to their liberal interpretation of Islam.

Many have retained ancestral social structures, with Bantu tribal origins in southeastern Africa serving as a principal form of social organization. Smaller units are further divided according to matrilineal kinship groups, the latter of which are often interchangeable with ceremonial dance groupings. Meanwhile, they do maintain some traditions of their own, such as the common act of basket weaving. Another important cultural aspect of the Bantu people consists art using bright colors and fabrics. Primarily for security reasons, some Somali Bantus have attempted to attach themselves to groups within the Somalis' indigenous patrilineal clan system of social stratification. These Bantus are referred to by the Somalis as sheegato or sheegad (literally "pretenders"), meaning they are not ethnically Somali and are attached to a Somali group on an adoptive, client basis. Somali Bantus that have retained their ancestral southeast African traditions have likewise been known to level sarcasm at other Bantus who have tried to associate themselves with their Somali patrons, albeit without any real animosity (the civil war has actually served to strengthen relationships between the various Bantu sub-groups). There has been very little co-mingling between Somali Bantus and Somalis. Formal intermarriage is extremely rare, and typically results in ostracism the few times it does occur.

=== Post-1991 ===
During the Somali Civil War, many Bantu were forced from their lands in the lower Juba River valley, as various Somali militias took control of the area. Being visible minorities and possessing little in the way of firearms, the Bantu were particularly vulnerable to violence and looting by gun-toting militiamen.

Immediately following the outbreak of the civil war, warring factions forced the Somali Bantu off their fertile lands around the Jubba river and their food stocks were looted. The largest flow of refugees occurred in 1992, when gunfights along the Jubba River became more frequent. Due to the subsequent famine, around 45% of Somali Bantus fled Somalia. Tens of thousands of Bantus fled to refugee camps like Dadaab in neighboring Kenya, with most vowing never to return to Somalia. In 1991, 12,000 Bantu people were displaced into Kenya, and nearly 3,300 were estimated to have returned to Tanzania. In 2002, the International Organization for Migration (IOM) moved a large number of Bantu refugees 1500kms to Kakuma in northwest Kenya because it was safer to process them for resettlement farther away from the Somali border. Many Bantu refugees in Kenya fear to return to Somalia, feeling that as a threatened minority they would become still more vulnerable.

Many Somali Bantu also fled to neighboring Yemen.

=== Resettlement in the United States ===
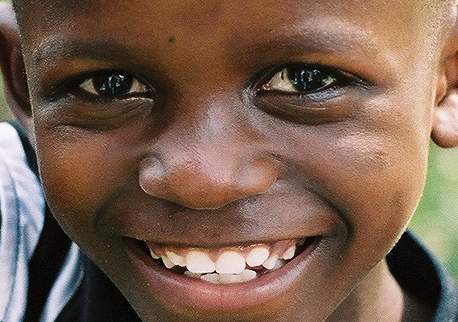
A Somali Bantu refugee boy in Florida

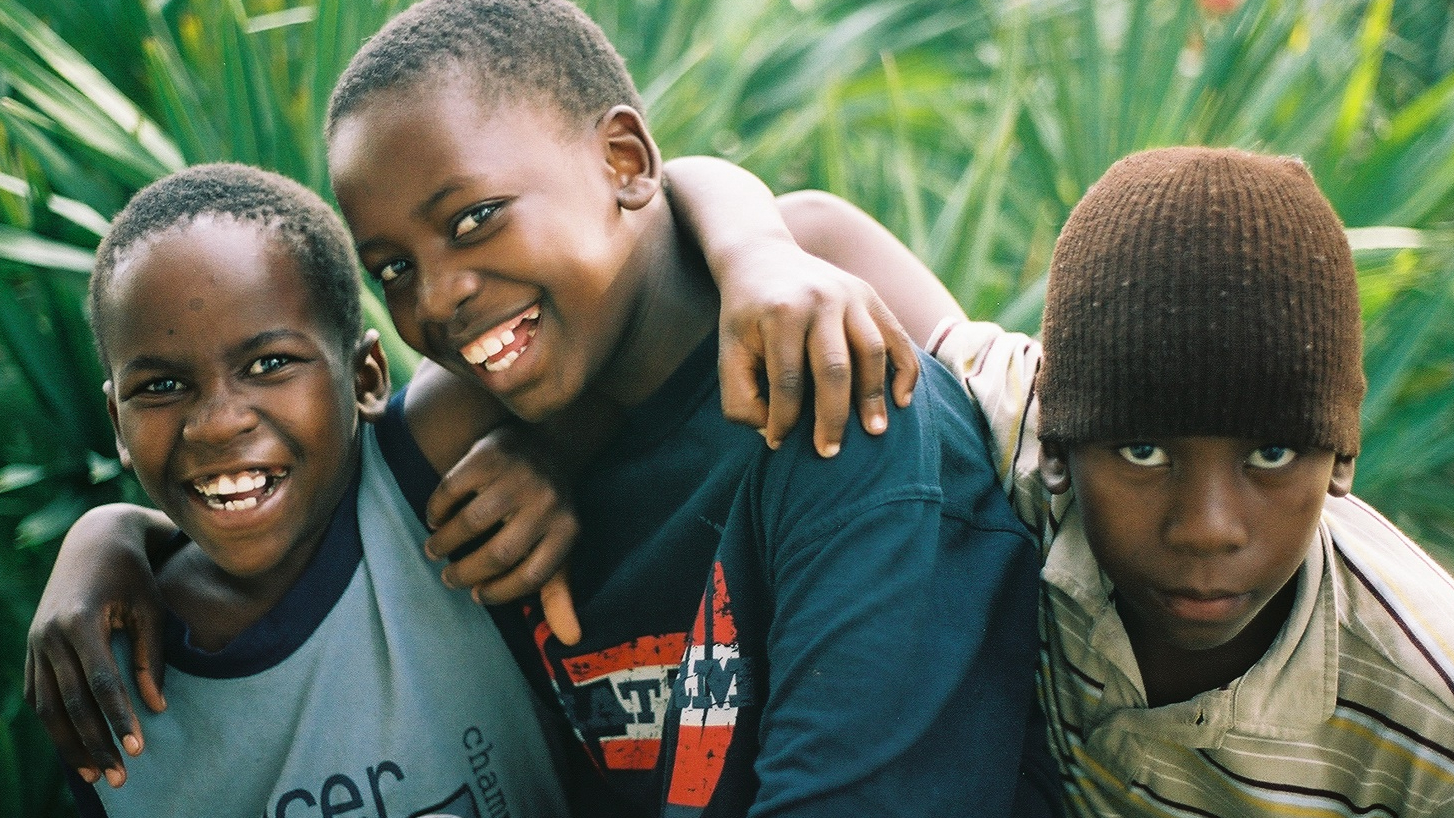
Somali Bantu children in Florida

The Somali Bantu were among the groups most severely affected by the outbreak of the Somali Civil War. Thousands were subjected to killings, rape, looting, and displacement. Many fled to refugee camps in neighboring Kenya, including Dadaab and Kakuma, where advocacy efforts eventually led the United States Congress to approve the resettlement of approximately 13,000 Somali Bantu refugees. The United States had classified the Bantu refugees from Somalia as a priority and the United States Department of State first began what has been described as the most ambitious resettlement plan ever from Africa, with thousands of Bantus scheduled for resettlement in America. In 2003, the first Bantu immigrants began to arrive in U.S. cities, and by 2007, around 13,000 had been resettled to cities throughout the United States with the help of the United Nations High Commissioner for Refugees (UNHCR), the U.S. State Department, and refugee resettlement agencies across the country. Approximately 15,000 Somali Bantus were resettled to 52 sites in the United States.

Somali Bantu refugees in camps had mixed reactions to the proposed resettlement in the United States, as many had no relatives there and little knowledge of American society. Some were uncertain or opposed to leaving, expressing fears that they would be required to convert to Christianity and questioning how they would maintain their culture and religion in the United States. Others remained in the camps because they were struggling with these concerns, while some who accepted resettlement saw it primarily as a chance for safety and peace despite not knowing what life in America would be like. In some cases, individuals refused to register for the programme altogether due to the uncertainty. To be accepted for resettlement in the United States, Somali Bantu refugees were required to demonstrate their ethnicity, present a history of persecution, appear on earlier resettlement lists, and meet U.S. definitions of family structure. Applicants were also assessed against prevailing U.S. understandings of Somali Bantu identity, including physical appearance in some cases, as part of determining eligibility. The resettlement criteria followed American definitions of “economic dependants,” in which only minor children were counted within a family unit, while adult children, siblings, and other relatives were not considered dependants. This often led to the restructuring of extended Somali Bantu kinship networks into nuclear family units, with some family members excluded from resettlement. In one documented case, an American interviewer rejected a husband and some children after questioning whether he belonged to the Somali Bantu category, while other members of the same extended family were accepted. As a result, families were often forced to choose between remaining together in the refugee camps or splitting in order to pursue resettlement.

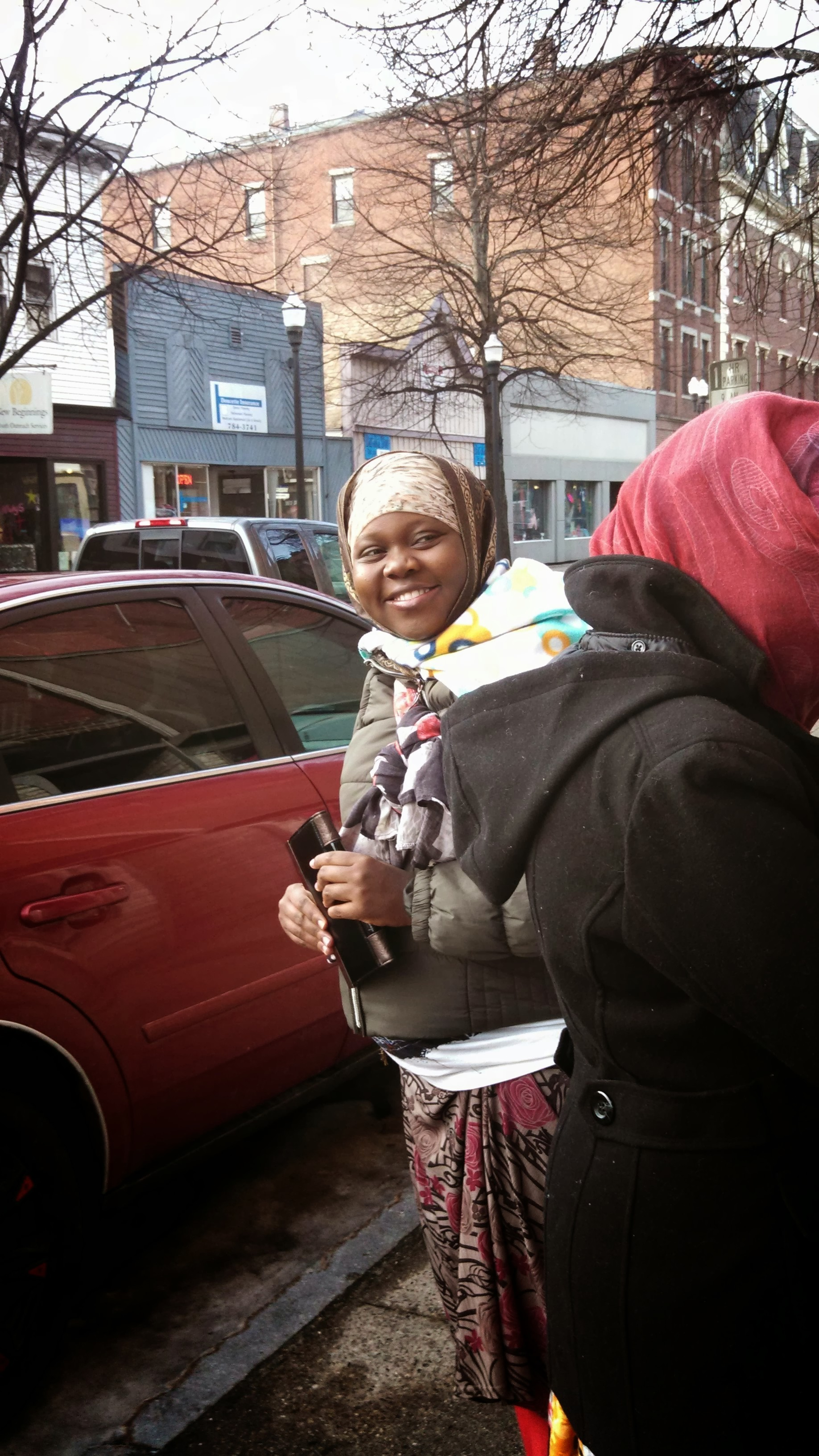
Somali Bantu woman in Lewiston, Maine.

Among the resettlement destinations, it is known that Salt Lake City, Utah received about 1,000 Bantus. Other cities in the southwest such as Denver, Colorado, San Antonio, Texas, and Tucson, Arizona have received a few thousand as well. In New England, Manchester, New Hampshire and Burlington, Vermont were also destinations selected for resettlement of several hundred. The documentary film Rain in a Dry Land chronicles this journey, with stories of Bantu refugees resettled in Springfield, Massachusetts and Atlanta, Georgia. Plans to resettle the Bantu in smaller towns, such as Holyoke, Massachusetts and Cayce, South Carolina, were scrapped after local protests. There are also communities of several hundred to a thousand Bantu people in cities that also have high concentrations of ethnic Somalis such as the Minneapolis-St. Paul area, Columbus, Ohio, Atlanta, San Diego, Boston, Pittsburgh, and Seattle, with a notable presence of about 1,000 Bantus in Lewiston, Maine. Making Refuge follows Somali Bantus' strenuous journey towards eventual resettlement in Lewiston and details several families' stories of relocating there. Following the resettlement of approximately 10,000 Somali Bantu refugees in the United States between 2004 and 2006, many relocated to Lewiston, Maine. The town was preferred by the Somali Bantu community because of its affordability, employment opportunities, schools, and social services.

Upon their resettlement in Lewiston, however, Bantus were met with a great amount of hostility from local Lewiston residents. In 2002, former Mayor Laurier Raymond wrote an open letter to Somali Bantu residents in an effort to dissuade them from further relocation to Lewiston. He proclaimed their resettlement to the town had become a "burden" on the community and predicted an overall negative impact on the town's social services and resources. In 2003, members of a white supremacist group demonstrated in support of the mayor's letter, which prompted a counter-demonstration of about 4,000 people at Bates College, as chronicled in documentary film The Letter. Despite such adversity, the Somali Bantu community in central Maine has continued to flourish and integrate in years since. There has also been reported political sensitivity surrounding UNHCR referrals for resettlement. Somali Bantu refugees reportedly received assistance in obtaining referrals for the United States refugee resettlement program from the Nairobi law firm Ibrahim and Isaac. The firm’s principal partner, Mohammed Ibrahim, has also been involved in legal action against the U.S. government related to victims of the 1998 embassy bombings in Kenya and Tanzania. Another factor behind the decision to resettle Somali Bantu refugees was pressure from the Congressional Black Caucus, which urged the U.S. government to address longstanding racial disparities in refugee admissions.

In her social studies of the Somali Bantu, Annette Wannamaker argued that resettlement in the United States significantly altered traditional Somali Bantu cultural practices and life-cycle rituals. She noted that displacement disrupted customary rites of passage into adulthood, leading young Somali Bantu refugees to seek new models of identity within American society, including through media consumption and popular culture.

In 2006, anthropologist Catherine Besteman collaborated with Somali Bantu community members in Lewiston, Maine, to develop educational and cultural initiatives documenting Somali Bantu history, refugee experiences, and resettlement in the United States. These projects included the Somali Bantu Experience website, museum exhibitions, educational materials, and public outreach programs.

In November 2008, the Somali Bantu Experience exhibition at the Colby College Museum of Art was developed through collaboration between students and Somali Bantu community members. It included photographs, material objects, maps, video, and interviews documenting Somali Bantu migration from southern Somalia through refugee camps in Kenya to the United States. Somali Bantu collaborators participated in curating materials and reviewing content, and community members attended the exhibition opening, which was followed by school visits, guided tours, and public discussions with Somali Bantu elders.

=== Return to ancestral home ===
Prior to the United States' agreement to accommodate Bantu refugees from Somalia, attempts were made to resettle the refugees to their ancestral homes in southeastern Africa. Before the prospect of emigrating to America was raised, this was actually the preference of the Bantus themselves. In fact, many Bantus voluntarily left the UN camps where they were staying, to seek refuge in Tanzania. Such a return to their ancestral homeland represented the fulfillment of a two-century old dream.

While Tanzania was initially willing to grant the Bantus asylum, the UNCHR did not provide any financial or logistical guarantees to support the resettlement and integration of the refugees into Tanzania. The Tanzanian authorities also experienced additional pressure when refugees from neighbouring Rwanda began pushing into the western part of the country, forcing them to retract their offer to accommodate the Bantus. On the other hand, the Bantus who spoke kizigula had already started arriving in Tanzania since before the war due to discrimination experienced in Somalia. Mozambique, the other ancestral home of the Bantu, then emerged as an alternative point of resettlement. However, as it became clear that the United States was prepared to accommodate the Bantu refugees, the Mozambican government soon backed out on its promises, citing a lack of resources and potential political instability in the region where the Bantu might have been resettled. Some Somali Bantu interviewed at the Dadaab refugee camp were able to speak Makua, the most widespread language of northern Mozambique, and over 10,000 individuals reportedly expressed a desire to be repatriated to Mozambique.

By the late 2000s, the situation in Tanzania had improved, and the Tanzanian government began granting Bantus citizenship and allocating them land in areas of Tanzania where their ancestors are known to have been taken from as slaves. In 2024, Somalia joined the East African Community, a trade bloc with many member states where the Somali Bantu have ancestral ties to and has the objective of establishing freedom of movement.

=== Conflict and displacement ===
In April 2017, violence targeting Somali Bantu communities was reported in the Balcad district of Middle Shabelle. According to reports, security forces affiliated with the regional administration killed a Somali Bantu man and burned hundreds of homes in three predominantly Bantu villages, displacing thousands of residents. In June 2017, five Somali Bantu men were reportedly abducted and executed by an Abgaal clan militia while travelling to Mogadishu. Community leaders sought mediation with local clan elders, but reports indicated that attacks against Bantu communities continued due to disputes over grazing and agricultural land. On another occasion, according to a Bantu elder, one reported case involved a Somali Bantu family who had lived on land for generations, but were later displaced after a wealthier Somali obtained formal documentation, despite the family’s long-term residence on the land. Somali Bantus are disproportionately represented amongst IDP populations in Somalia.

== See also ==
- History of Somali Bantus in Maine
- Indian Ocean slave trade
- Bantu peoples
