= Siraji =

Siraji may refer to:

== Languages ==
- Siraji of Doda, or Sarazi, a language of Jammu, India
- Inner Siraji, a dialect of the Kullui language of Himachal Pradesh, India
- Outer Siraji, a dialect of the Mahasu Pahari language of Himachal Pradesh, India

== People with the name ==
- Habibullah Siraji (1948–2021), Bangladeshi poet
- Ismail Hossain Siraji (1880–1931), Bengali writer
- Abbas Abdullahi Sheikh Siraji (1984–2017), Somali politician
- Mohamud Siraji, Somali politician
- Yahya bin Muhammad as-Siraji (died 1296), Yemeni imam
- Siraji Mwenjuma Chambali (born 1999), Tanzania CPA

== See also ==
- Saraji coal mine, in Australia
