= Kalobeyei Refugee Settlement =

Refuge camp in Kenya

- camp
- Location of Turkana County in Kenya

- Location in Kenya
- Coordinates: 03°18′N 35°13′E
- Country: Kenya
- County: Turkana County

Population
  - Total: ~254,962 People

Kalobeyei Refugee Settlement, also known as Kalobeyei Integrated Settlement, is a refugee camp located in Turkana County, Kenya. The settlement was established in 2015 to accommodate the growing number of South Sudanese refugees who fled their country due to the conflict that broke out in December 2013.

== History ==
The Kalobeyei Refugee Settlement was established in 2015 to cater to the increasing number of South Sudanese refugees who fled their country as a result of the conflict that occurred in December 2013. The camp is situated about 40 km northwest of Kakuma and measures 15 square kilometers. As of 2021, the camp is home to approximately 38,000 refugees, including people from South Sudan, Ethiopia, Somalia, Burundi, and other countries, as well as members of the host community.

== Demographics ==
As of 2021, the camp was home to approximately 38,000 refugees, including people from South Sudan, Ethiopia, Somalia, Burundi, and other countries, as well as members of the host community. As of March 2023, the population of the Kakuma-Kalobeyei refugee hosting area is over 254,962 people, according to UNHCR. Kalobeyei Settlement, designed for sustainable urban and agricultural development for both the host community (estimated at 20,000) and refugees, contributes to this figure.

== Developments ==
The Kalobeyei Integrated Social and Economic Development Programme, also known as KISEDP, is a collaborative initiative between the United Nations High Commissioner for Refugees (UNHCR) and the World Bank. Its primary goal is to promote the self-reliance of refugees and host communities by providing them with improved livelihood opportunities and enhanced service delivery. This program aims to not only improve the socio-economic conditions of the refugees and host communities but also prepare the host community to take advantage of emerging economic opportunities, such as extraction activities and potential irrigation-fed agriculture. By reducing over-dependence on humanitarian aid, KISEDP seeks to support the refugees in achieving durable solutions. The settlement is characterized by the sustainable development of urban and agricultural/livestock areas for both the estimated population of 20,000 in the host community and the estimated population of 60,000 refugees. The program emphasizes non-discriminatory services for all, avoids parallel service delivery, and actively involves the private sector.

== Care and maintenance ==
The ongoing care and maintenance program is centered on delivering fundamental humanitarian assistance to refugees, encompassing complimentary sustenance, non-food provisions, and essential services. However, due to the prolonged displacement lasting for more than two decades, the current form of aid does not adequately cater to the specific needs, circumstances, and prospects of both refugees and host communities. The camp's economic potential has yet to be fully harnessed, leading the host community, which already faces considerable marginalization in Kenya, to express dissatisfaction with the limited benefits derived from the presence of refugees.

== Turkana Roundtable ==
At the November 2014 Turkana Roundtable on the Integration of Refugees and Host Community Economies, there was unanimous agreement on the necessity for a different approach to refugee assistance programming in the county. This was due to the desire to prevent a situation similar to the economic collapse that occurred after the repatriation of Sudanese refugees in 2005. Recognizing the importance of the issue, the United Nations High Commissioner for Refugees (UNHCR) and the Ministry of Interior and Coordination of National Government joined forces with the Turkana County Government to devise a settlement that would foster the self-reliance of refugees and host communities. This would be accomplished through the provision of improved livelihood opportunities and enhanced service delivery.

== See also ==
- Kakuma Refugee Camp, Kenya
- Hagadera Refugee Camp
