= Mohamud Siraji =

محمود عبد الله شيخ سراج Mohamud Abdullahi Sheikh Siraji
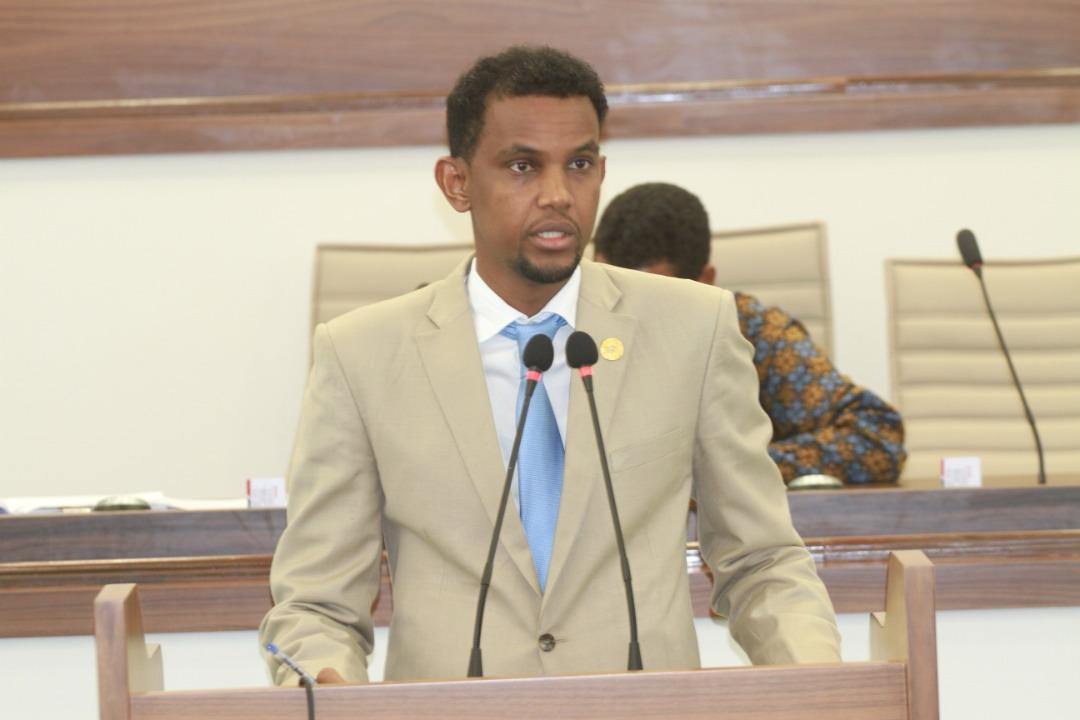

Member of Somali Federal Parliament
- Incumbent
- Assumed office 15 February 2018
- Prime Minister: Hassan Ali Khaire
- Preceded by: Abbas Abdullahi Sheikh Siraji

Chairman of House Committee on Budget, Finance, Financial Oversight
- Incumbent
- Assumed office 26 December 2018

Personal details
- Citizenship: Somali
- Party: Independent
- Relations: Abbas Abdullahi Sheikh Siraji
- Education: York University, Edinburgh Business School, Heriot-Watt University, University of Salford
- Website: https://mosiraji.com/

Mohamud Abdullahi Sheikh Siraji (Somali: Maxamuud Cabdulaahi Sheikh Siraaji; Arabic: محمود عبد الله شيخ سراج ) is a Somali politician who was elected from the state of Jubaland as a member of Federal Parliament of Somalia on 15 February 2018. Mohamud is the younger brother of the late Minister for Public Works and Reconstruction Abass Abdullahi Sheikh Siraji.

== Early life and education ==
Born to a religious family, Mohamud spent a great deal of his life living in Dadaab Refugee camp of North Eastern Kenya. When she was 3, Siraji's family moved to Kenya's Dadaab camps via Liboi seeking refuge from the civil war in Somalia.

Born to strict religious parents, Siraji and his siblings have started Qur'anic school (Duksi) at an early age. It was long before he completed his Qur'anic studies and started learning the Islamic Jurisprudence also known as Fiq.

Mohamud completed both his primary and secondary school in Dadaab, Ifo Refugee Camp, and later proceeded to Toronto, Canada to study a Bachelor of Commerce at York University.

Siraji graduated at the top of his class in both primary and secondary school. Based on his performance on the national examination, he received a scholarship to pursue a bachelor's degree in Canada.

== Politics ==
Even though Mohamud joined active politics after the assassination of his late brother, he was actively involved in student organizations and youth advocacy groups. He has been involved in student leadership both in high school and in university. He served in various roles ranging from VP Finance to president in student organization in university.

After the assassination of his late brother, Abass Siraji, he decided to come back and serve his country. After a 9-month wait, he finally won the by-election on landslide on the 15th of Feb 2018.

== Committees ==
Siraji held assignments on multiple committees, e.g., the House Committee on Budget, Finance, Planning, and Financial Oversight of Public Institutions; Committee on Food Security and Nutrition, East Africa Parliamentary Alliance on Food Security and Nutrition (EAPA FSN); and the Ad hoc Committee to complete the Elections Act

=== House Committee on Budget, Finance, Planning, and Financial Oversight of Public Institutions ===
On December 26, 2018, Mohamud Siraji was elected as the chairman of the House Committee on Budget, Finance, Planning, International Cooperation and Financial Oversight of Public Institutions. His election came after the former leadership of the committee hasdbeen disbanded after they submitted a controversial financial report that claimed that over $42 million havdbeen lost through corruption. This, however, was later deemed to be an incorrect report, and the parliament apologized for the wrong report on the missing money.

=== Committee on Food Security and Nutrition ===
In October 2018, Siraji together with Hon. Abdi Ali, attended te Global Parliamentary Summit against Hunger and Malnutrition held in Madrid, Spain. In this summit, Siraji gave a moving speech bout the status of food security in his home country of Somalia and pledged to form a parliamentary group that will dedicate to advocating for food security and nutrition in Somalia. On his return to the country, Siraji, together with Hon. Ali, advocated for the formation of a parliamentary roup dedicated itoensuring that the government allocates resources that will ensure food security and nutrition. In March 2019, Fthe ood Security and Nutrition Committee was formed with Siraji being a member.

=== East Africa Parliamentary Alliance on Food Security and Nutrition (EAPA FSN) ===
Following the Madrid meeting, Siraji pledged to form food security committee both in Somalia and the Region. This followed subsequent meetings in Rwanda, Kenya and Tanzania and the ultimate formation of the East Africa Parliamentary Alliance on Food Security and Nutrition (EAPA FSN)

This is a regional committee composed of all the East African countries. Somalia is represented by Hon. Siraji and Hon. Ali. The East Africa Parliamentary Alliance on Food Security and Nutrition (EAPA FSN) is currently chaired by Somalia's Hon. Abdi Ali Hassan

== Bills Sponsored ==
Mohamud who is the chair of the Committee on Budget, Finance, Planning and Financial Oversight of Public Institutions, was awarded the best performing member of parliament by the speaker on the closing ceremony of the 6th session of the 10th parliament. In just under a year, Siraj tabled over 10 bills that have all been approved by both houses of the parliament. Some of the bills he sponsored are: Public Financial Management Act (PFM), Customs Act, Statistics Act, Revenue Management Act, Amendments to Procurement Act, The Audit Bill etc.

=== Public Financial Management (PFM) Act ===
Public Financial Management (PFM) Act is one of the benchmarks that was set for the government of Somalia in order to qualify for debt relief by the IMF. Siraji who was spearheading the legislative aspect of the SMP debt relief process, tabled the PFM act for debating and pushed for it until it was approved by both houses and signed into law by the president on 25th Dec. 2019

Public financial management (PFM) is critical to basic economic governance and essential in establishing the performance, legitimacy and accountability of functional states.

Public financial management has to do with the effective administration of funds collected and spent by governments. It underlies all government activity and incorporates all components of a country's budget cycle including:

- the mobilisation of revenue
- the allocation of these funds to various activities
- the expenditure and accounting for spent funds

Ineffective public financial management systems hamper development and increase the risk of corruption.

=== Revenue Management Act ===
Just like the PFM act, the Revenue Management Act was a key element to the SMP debt relief benchmarks set by IMF and the World Bank in order for Somalia to qualify for debt relief. This act was controversial as all the member states unilaterally rejected it since they have not initially been consulted. This was an opportunity for the young Siraji to shine as he embarked on consultative meetings with the Federal Member states. This bill was tabled for 2nd and 3rd reading on the 26th of Oct. 2019 and within the course, the bill was as well approved by the upper house.

On the 27th of Oct. 2019, the president signed the bill into an act

=== Statistics Act ===
Statistics Act was also an SMP benchmark that the Federal Government of Somalia has to meet before it can qualify for debt relief under the IMF/World Bank Highly Indebted Poor Countries (HIPC) initiative.

The bill was approved on the third reading by the House of the People (HoP) of theparliament of Somalia on 28 October 2019 and the president signed the bill into law.

== Role on Debt Relief ==
For Somalia to qualify the debt relief under the HIPC initiative, it had to do both structural and policy changes. The government of Somalia were required to streamline their public financial systems so that they can be entrusted with funds. For that to happen, a dozen number of bills all related to Finance had to be enacted into a law. While the actual decision eventually happened to be March 2020, the IMF and World Bank initially suggested to have the decision point pushed back to March 2021 because it was almost impossible to pass all the necessary bills through the parliament.

Siraji who was at the time the chairman of the Budget and Finance Committee took the sole responsibility to fast track the passage of those bills in both houses of the parliament. For a period of one year, Siraji and his committee tirelessly worked to meet all the benchmark set for the country in order to qualify the debt relief. As announced by the IMF on their website, Somalia successfully met all the benchmarks and a such, qualified to receive a debt relief under the HIPC process- thanks to Siraji and the team that worked to make this happen.

== Deputy Minister of Foreign Affairs & International Cooperation ==
On 19 October 2020, Prime Minister Roble announced his new cabinet with Hon. Mohamud Siraji nominated as the deputy minister of Foreign Affairs & International Cooperation. On 24 October, the House of the People of the Federal Republic of Somalia gave the vote of confidence and approved the new cabinet.
