= Abbas Abdullahi Sheikh Siraji =

عباس عبد الله شيخ سراج Abbas Abdullahi Sheikh Siraji
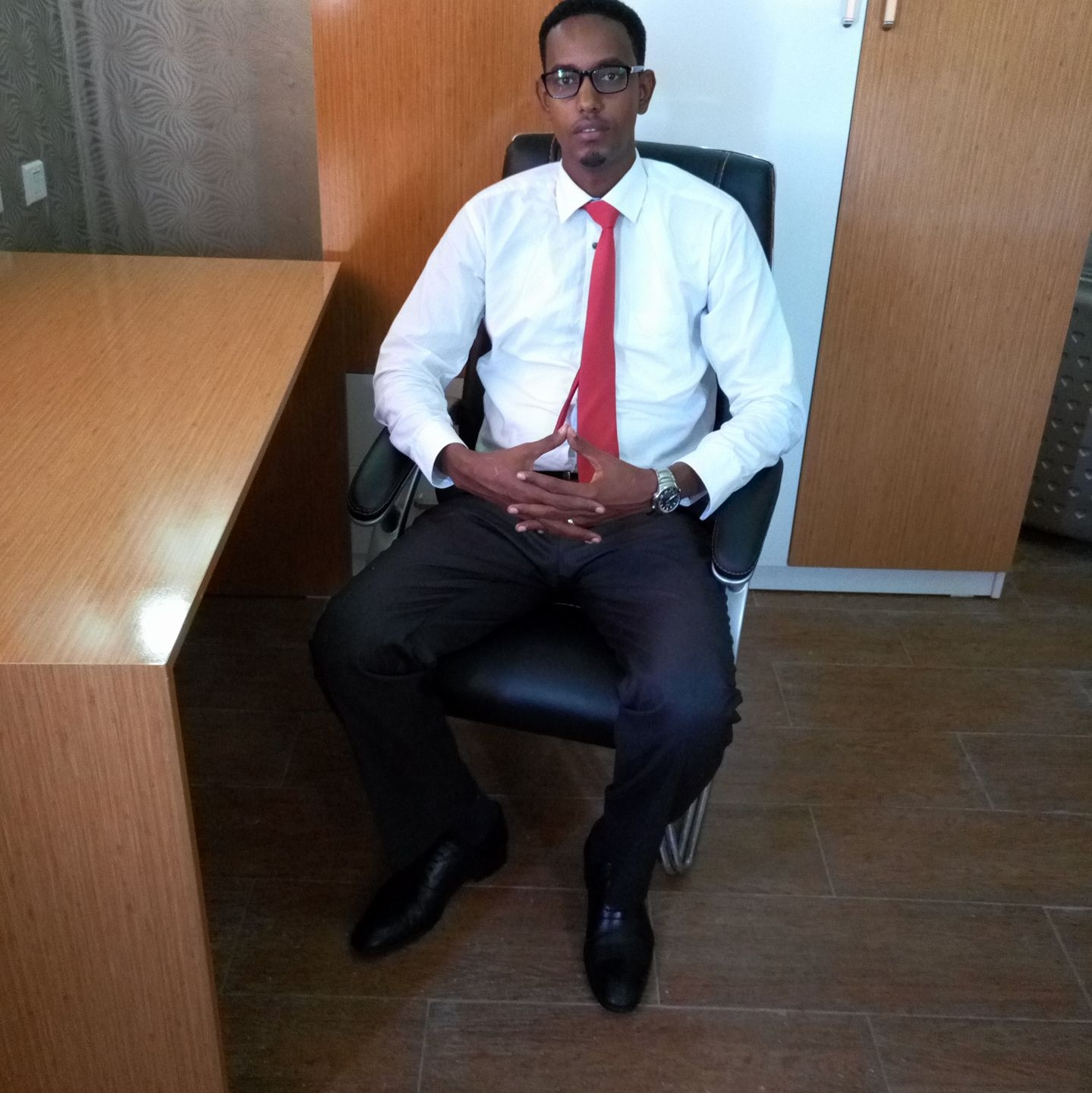

Minister of Public Works and Reconstruction
- In office 4 April 2017 – 3 May 2017
- Prime Minister: Hassan Ali Khaire
- Preceded by: Salah Sheikh Osman Mose

Personal details
- Born: 8 May 1984 Afmadow, Somalia
- Died: 3 May 2017 (aged 32) Mogadishu, Somalia
- Resting place: Medina Hospital, Mogadishu
- Citizenship: Somalia
- Party: Independent
- Relations: Mohamud Siraji
- Education: Moi University
- Website: https://absiraj.com/

Abbas Abdullahi Sheikh Siraji (Somali: Cabaas Cabdulaahi Sheekh Siraaji; Arabic: (عباس عبد الله شيخ سراج) born 8 May 1984 – 3 May 2017) was a Somali politician who briefly served as the Minister of Public Works and Reconstruction until he was shot dead in Mogadishu in 2017.

== Personal life ==
Born to a prestigious religious family of the Rahanweyn clan, Abbas grew uo in Dadaab refugee camps. By the age of 5, his parents moved with him and his siblings to Liboi refugee camps in 1991 and later relocated to Dadaab refugee camp in 1992.

Abbass as a young kid, started his education with Qur'anic Dugsi (school) and completed learning the holy Qur'an before the age of 10. His father was a sheikh and a respected scholar in the Somali community, and so is his grandfather. It wasn't too long before he had a full grasp of the ahadith (prophet's teachings) and the Fiqh (Islamic Jjrisprudence).

He started primary school by the then Jack Asiyo Primary School later renamed as Halane Primary School (1994-1998), and proceeded to Midnimo ("Unity") primary school for Upper Primary education (1999-2001). He finished high school at Ifo Secondary School (ISS) in Ifo Camp (Dadaab) in 2005. He later proceeded to NEP Technical Training College (NEP TTC) in Garissa, NE Kenya. It was at NEP Technical where Abbas had his first exposure to politics and was the president of the Students Union. Historically, there has always been a tension between the Somali students and the non-Somali students at Nep Technical. It was Abass that brokered peace between the two teams.

He later joined Kenya Methodist University and then Moi University to pursue a degree in Business Administration.

W Abbas went back to Somalia in 2011 to take a job with the humanitarian agencies working in Somalia. He worked with the likes of FAO and later began her political career. In 2016 he was selected by an Electoral college for the position as MP for Kismayo (House of the People) in the Federal Parliament of Somalia.

== Minister of Public Works and Reconstruction ==
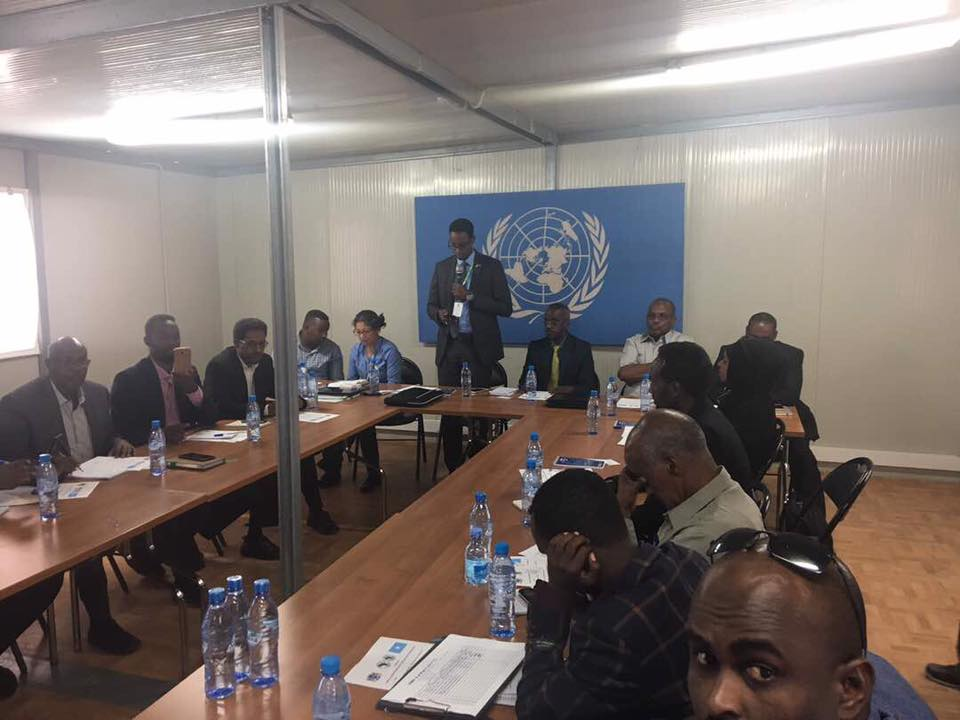

On 21 March 2017, Prime Minister Hassan Ali Khaire named Siraji as the next Minister of Public Works and Reconstruction. He took office on 4 April during a handover ceremony at the Ministry of Public Works, making him the youngest ever cabinet member at age 31.

== Death ==
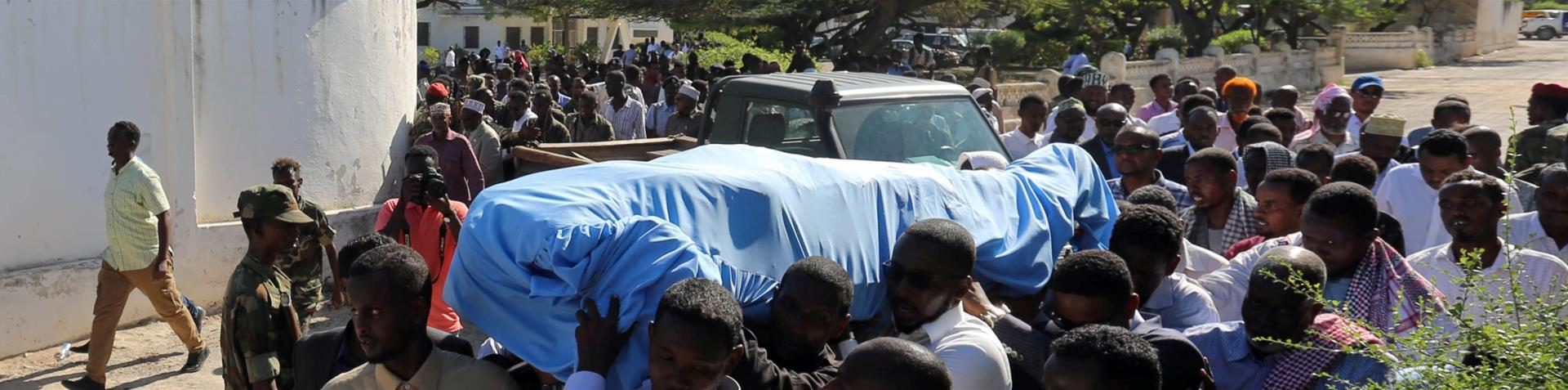

Initial reports suggested that Siraji was shot and killed on 3 May 2017, when soldiers on a patrol opened fire as he drove his vehicle near the Villa Somalia. The circumstances of the shooting were not immediately clear. Media reports said the soldiers may have perceived Siraji's vehicle as a threat. A number of people have been reportedly arrested in connection with his death. Later reports have indicated that Siraji was traveling in his car behind a vehicle convoy bearing the Auditor General Nur Jimale Farah, when the bodyguards of the latter apparently somehow mistook Siraji's car for a VBIED being driven by a suicide bomber targeting the Auditor General and so opened fire on it.

The minister received a full state funeral the day after his killing, attended by President Mohamed Abdullahi Mohamed and Prime Minister Hassan Ali Khaire along with other senior figures.
