= Rain in a Dry Land =

- Directed by: Anne Makepeace
- Written by: Anne Makepeace
- Produced by: Anne Makepeace
- Cinematography: Joan Churchill, Barney Broomfield
- Edited by: Mary Lampson
- Music by: Joel Goodman
- Release date: February 2006
- Running time: 82 minutes
- Language: English

Rain in a Dry Land is a 2006 documentary film directed by Anne Makepeace and filmed by Joan Churchill & Barney Broomfield that chronicles the experiences of two Bantu as they are transported by relief organizations from Kenyan refugee camps to Atlanta, Georgia and then Springfield, Massachusetts.

Rain in a Dry Land Makepeace also wrote and produced the documentary and was broadcast as part of PBS's Point of View series.
