= Salah Sheikh Osman Mose =

Somali politician (born 1957)

H.E Engineer Salah Sheik Osman Mose

Minister of Public Works and Reconstruction Somalia
- In office 27 January 2015 – 29 March 2017
- President: Hassan Sheikh Mohamud
- Prime Minister: Omar Abdirashid Ali Sharmarke
- Succeeded by: Abbas Abdullahi Sheikh Siraji

Personal details
- Born: 1957 (age 68–69) Afgoi-Somalia
- Party: Independent

Salah Sheik Osman Mose (Somali: Saalax Shiikh Cusman) (born 25 September 1957), He is the former Minister of Public Works and Reconstruction of Somalia. He was appointed to the position on 27 January 2015 by the now former Prime Minister Omar Abdirashid Ali Sharmarke. and unanimously approved by the Parliament of Somalia.He previously served in the MP Somali Federal Parliament in 2000/2004. Salah was in Afgoi, Lower Shabelle region, He grew up mostly in Merca, He also Served as Military Service in Somalia (Halane), He was Assigned as teacher to the Kurtunwarey High School in Lower Shabelle region in Somalia. he graduated From Somali National University 1985 Faculty of Agriculture, after graduating master's degree of Civil Construction Engineering in 1990. he worked C.I.C.S.E.N.E., Torino (Italy) as Platform for Construction Development of emerging nations.

He became a Teacher and Coordinator Projects Afgoi from 1992 to 2004. he was member of the Technical Selection Committee of (TSC) the body responsible for vetting candidates nominated by traditional elders to stand as legislators in the new federal parliament of Somalia in 2012.

== Career ==
=== Military service in Somalia ===
In 1978 to 79, Salah was assigned as a teacher to the Kurtunwarey High School in Lower Shabelle region in Somalia. He was a teacher of Maths and Arabic at that school.

=== United Nations (BIT-ILO) ===
From 1980 to 1986, he worked as a Social Assistant at the International Centre for Advanced Technical and Vocational Training. According to the cited source, he worked with the fellows' services section and helped organize training and leisure activities for participants. The source also states that he worked in a multicultural environment involving participants from more than 150 nationalities and communicated in five to six languages.

=== University ===
In 1983 to 1989, he was a student in the University of Civil-Engineering in Italy and voluntary services responsible to raise funds for the realization of a project for the socio-economic rehabilitation of the district of Afgoi-Somalia. To Study and implement micro projects that involve directly the Somali citizens on their lands, based on self-promotion.

=== Borini Construzioni ===
In 1989 to 1990, he had prepared a practical studies in structural design for various projects and consulting engineering companies in Turin. He was member of staff to make projects for 7 flats in Turin Residence. He was doing stage from university during that period in Borini Company.

=== C.I.C.S.E.N.E. ===
In 1990 to 1991, he used to work as the Platform for Construction Development of emerging nations to Involve the Somali community residing in Turin-Italy, to favour a better relation with their own Country. To inform the public opinion by circulating true and concrete information through press-conferences, meetings, debates, publications for the schools and for the citizens.

=== Mattioda Pierino and Figli ===
In 1991 to 1995, he worked as the Design and Construction Department staff member Supervising over 75 staff working on a tunnel construction project.

=== Teacher and Coordinator Projects Afgoi (Somalia) ===
In 1995 to 2007, he used to work as teacher in Afgoi. The main responsibilities of his tenure was: • Coordinating and teaching in 6 schools in Somalia for 6000 students. • Coordinating the construction of water wells and schools in Somalia. • Responsible for a project related water supply, health, education and rehabilitation in the area of the Lower Shabelle region in Somalia.

=== Somalia Humanitarian Aid (UK), London ===
In 2008 to 2009, he worked as the Administering a project to support the elderly. His activity was concentrated on visits and the support at home or in the socio-assisting structures, a commitment that is a must for the volunteers. The most immediate to bring help where it is most needed, and in order to never lose contact with the suffering persons.

=== Technical Selection Committee ===
In 2012, Salah was a member of The TSC. The body of people responsible for vetting candidates nominated by traditional elders to stand as legislators in the new federal parliament.

=== Advisor ===
In 2012, Salah served as the political advisor to the office of The Speaker of the Federal Republic of Somalia.

=== Teacher ===
In 2014, Salah worked as Math lecturer at Southend community adult College.

== Education ==
=== Somali National University (SNU) ===
In 1979 to 1985, he studied Faculty of Agriculture from Somali National University.

=== Master's degree of engineering ===
In 1990, he graduated Polytechnic University of Turin (Italy), Faculty of Civil Construction Engineering.

=== Level 5(DTLLS) ===
In 2012–2015, Diploma in Teaching in the Lifelong Learning Sector – DTLLS.

=== Conflict management ===
In 2014–2015, Diploma in conflict management and terrorism awareness.

== Minister ==
In 2015, Salah was named as the Minister for public works, reconstruction and housing in Somalia.

== Voluntary activities ==
=== Chairman of the "Sheik Osman Muuse Foundation" ===
In 1983 to currently, Fundraising, networking within various international platforms to raise awareness for Somali and African issues.

=== ILO (Italy) ===
In 1983 to 2014, Project coordinator for the construction of water wells and schools in Somalia. And also the distribution of food and medical aid to the people of Somalia.
