= History of Somali Bantus in Maine =

Somali Bantu people living in Maine who are of Somali birth or descent

Somali Bantus are an ethnic group from Somalia. A significant community of them reside in Maine; as of 2012, there were around 1,000 in Lewiston.

== History ==
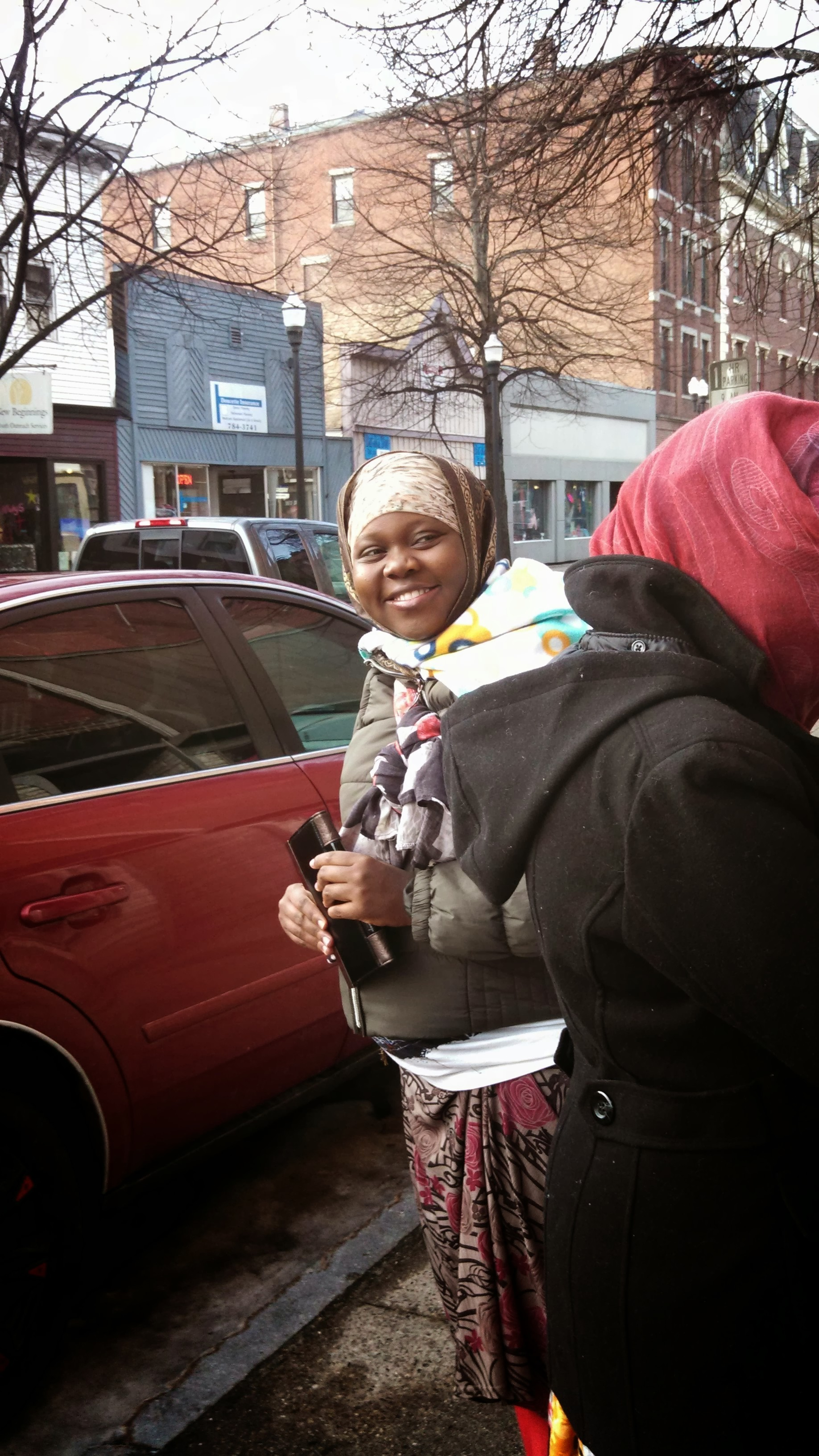
A Somali Bantu woman in Lewiston.

Somali Bantus are a minority ethnic group in Somalia, a country largely inhabited by ethnic Somalis. They are the descendants of people from various Bantu ethnic groups originating from what are modern-day Tanzania, Malawi and Mozambique who were brought to Somalia as slaves in the 19th century. Somali Bantus are ethnically, physically, and culturally distinct from Somalis, and have remained marginalized since their arrival in Somalia.

During the Somali Civil War, which first began with the overthrow of the central government in 1991, many Bantus were evicted from their lands by various armed factions of Somali clans. Being visible minorities and possessing little in the way of firearms, the Bantus were particularly vulnerable to violence and looting by militiamen. Tens of thousands of Bantus fled to refugee camps in neighboring Kenya.

In the year 2000, the United States classified the Bantu as a priority and began preparations to resettle an estimated 12,000 Bantu refugees in select cities throughout the U.S. Most of the early arrivals in the United States settled in Clarkston, Georgia, a city adjacent to Atlanta. However, they were mostly assigned to low rent, inner city areas, so many began to look to resettle elsewhere in the US, including Maine.

In 2006, KPMG International released a study identifying the best places to do business around the world and ranked Lewiston as the best in New England.

In June 2011, the Lewiston Sun Journal reported a growing number of Bantu recent immigrants earning high school diplomas and graduating in local community colleges. The university students consist of both adult undergraduate and continuing education pupils, as well as high school graduates.

== Demographics ==
There are about 1,000 Somali Bantu immigrants in Lewiston as of 2012.

The Somali Bantu Community Mutual Assistance Association of Lewiston/Auburn Maine (SBCMALA) serves the local Bantu community, focusing on housing, employment, literacy and education, health, and safety matters. It also runs an agriculture program for resident Bantus.

== See also ==
- History of the Somalis in Maine
