= Hagadera Refugee Camp =

- camp
- Location within Kenya
- Coordinates: 00°03′11″N 40°22′29″E
- Country: Kenya
- County: Garissa County

Population
  - Total: ~86,057
- Time zone: EAT

Hagadera Refugee Camp is one of the three camps that make up the Dadaab Refugee Complex in Kenya. It was established in 1992 and is the largest camp under the Dadaab operation, managed by UNHCR Field Office Alinjugur. The camp is located in the Fafi district, neighboring Lagdera (Dadaab) district where the other two camps, Dagahaley and Ifo, are located.

== History ==
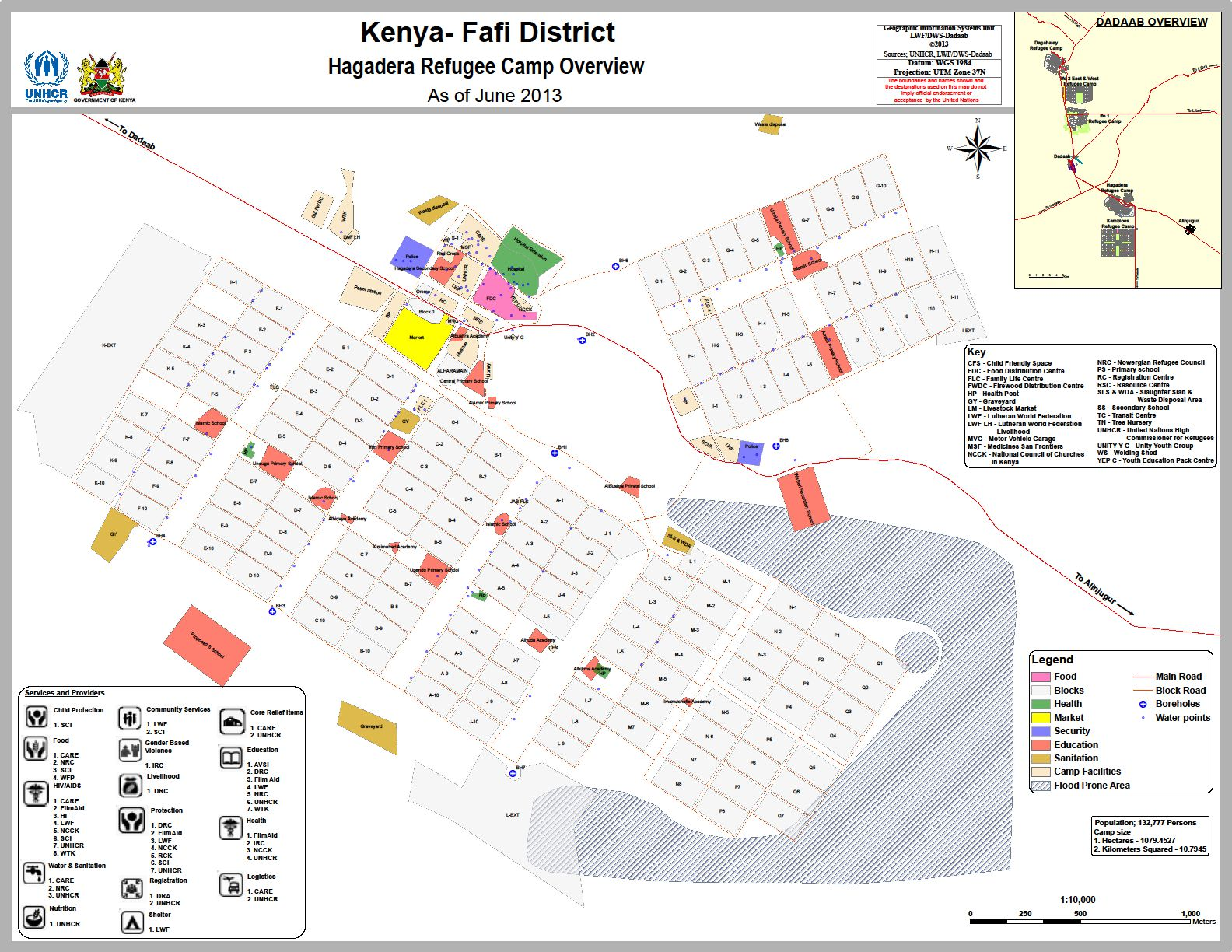
Hagadera Refugee Camp

Hagadera was established in 1992 and is the third oldest camp in the North-Eastern Province of Kenya. It is the largest camp under the Dadaab operation and is managed by the UNHCR Field Office Alinjugur. The population has decreased by over 45,000 in the last verification exercise. Most of the new arrivals are residing with relatives, while approximately 20,000 individuals have settled outside the designated camp area in what is known as Hagadera outskirts. The relocation exercise of 2011 and 2012 transferred around 2,000 families, encompassing approximately 10,000 individuals, to Kambioos in order to alleviate congestion in Hagadera camp. Further relocation of refugees to Kambioos is planned. Hagadera possesses one of the largest markets in the region, contributing to a vibrant and thriving economy.

== Demographics ==
As of July 2020, the population of Hagadera camp was 100,000, with over 95% of the refugees hailing from Somalia. A large part of the residents in the old camps (Ifo, Dagahaley, Hagadera) arrived in Dadaab in the 1990s and had children and grandchildren born in the camps. In 2014, the population in the camp was reported to be 107,666 (54,439 female, 53,227 male), 28,107 households with nationalities of Somalis 97.3%, Ethiopians and others 2.7%; the camp covers an area of 8.7 km^{2} (3.4 sq mi).

== Water and sanitation ==
Hagadera camp is equipped with six operational boreholes, providing a water supply of 20 liters per person per day, which aligns with the global standard. The camp currently has 100 taps available, leading to a situation where 1,100 individuals must share a single tap, a deviation from the accepted norm of 80 individuals per tap. Additionally, the ratio of individuals to latrines stands at approximately 13:1. To maintain sanitation, the camp has strategically placed 16 sanitary skips to efficiently dispose of rubbish.

== Health ==
The prolonged drought in the Horn of Africa has resulted in increased food insecurity, leading to heightened levels of malnutrition among both the refugees in Hagadera Refugee Camp and the general Kenyan population. Kenya's rainy season has also contributed to the overall vulnerability of the population, resulting in an upsurge in illnesses caused by malnutrition such as malaria. Moreover, food rations have been reduced to 80% of their usual quantity, significantly impacting the food security of refugees residing in Kenya. In 2022, at least three refugees have lost their lives and 504 others have been treated for severe dehydration following an outbreak of Cholera diseases at Hagadera in Dadaab Refugee Camp in Kenya.
