= Nyasa people =

Ethnic group from Ruvuma Region of Tanzania

The Nyasa are a people of southeastern Africa, concentrated mainly in Malawi, southwestern Tanzania and parts of northern Mozambique. The people are also known as the Kimanda, Kinyasa and Manda. Significant populations of Nyasa live along the shores of northeastern Lake Malawi. Many Nyanja people of Malawi refers to themselves as Nyasa; as of 2010 roughly 500,000 claim to be Nyasa people.

In Malawi, the Nyasa are a minority tribe with their own distinct culture. While matrilineal (much like the Chewa, the country's dominate tribe), the Nyasa's belief system is extremely different. Unlike the Chewa, which is part of the dominant Bantu culture, the Nyasa are part of the lesser known Nigha culture.

A further widely practiced belief is consensual non-monogamy, where the wife is enabled - and even encouraged - to have sexual relations with other single males. The same does not apply to the husband, who is expected to remain chaste to his wife.

== See also ==
- Nyasaland
- Lake Nyasa
