= Dadaab =

Dadaab Dhadhaab
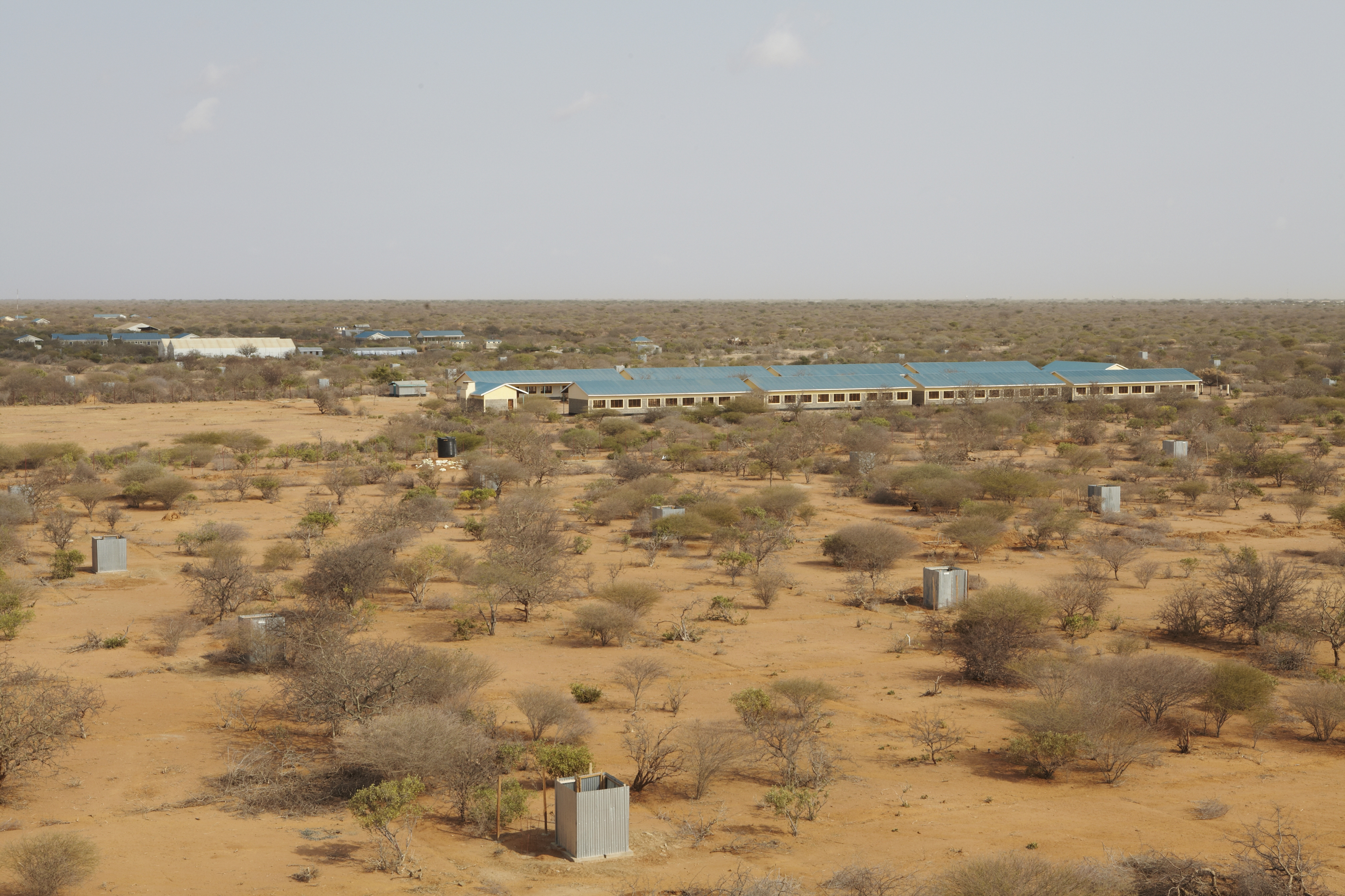
- Ifo II camp in Dadaab.

- Location within Kenya
- Coordinates: 00°03′11″N 40°18′31″E
- Country: Kenya
- County: Garissa County

Population (May 2026)
  - Total: 417,767
- Time zone: UTC+3 (EAT)

Dadaab (Somali: Dhadhaab) is a semi-arid town in Garissa County, Kenya. It is the site of a UNHCR base hosting 417,767 registered refugees and asylum seekers as of 31 May 2026, in four camps (Dagahaley, Hagadera and Ifo, and Ifo 2), making it one of the largest in the world behind Kutupalong refugee camp. The centre is run by the United Nations High Commissioner for Refugees, and its operations are financed by foreign donors. In 2013, UNHCR, the governments of Kenya and Somalia signed a tripartite agreement facilitating the repatriation of Somali refugees at the complex.

== Establishment ==
=== Construction ===
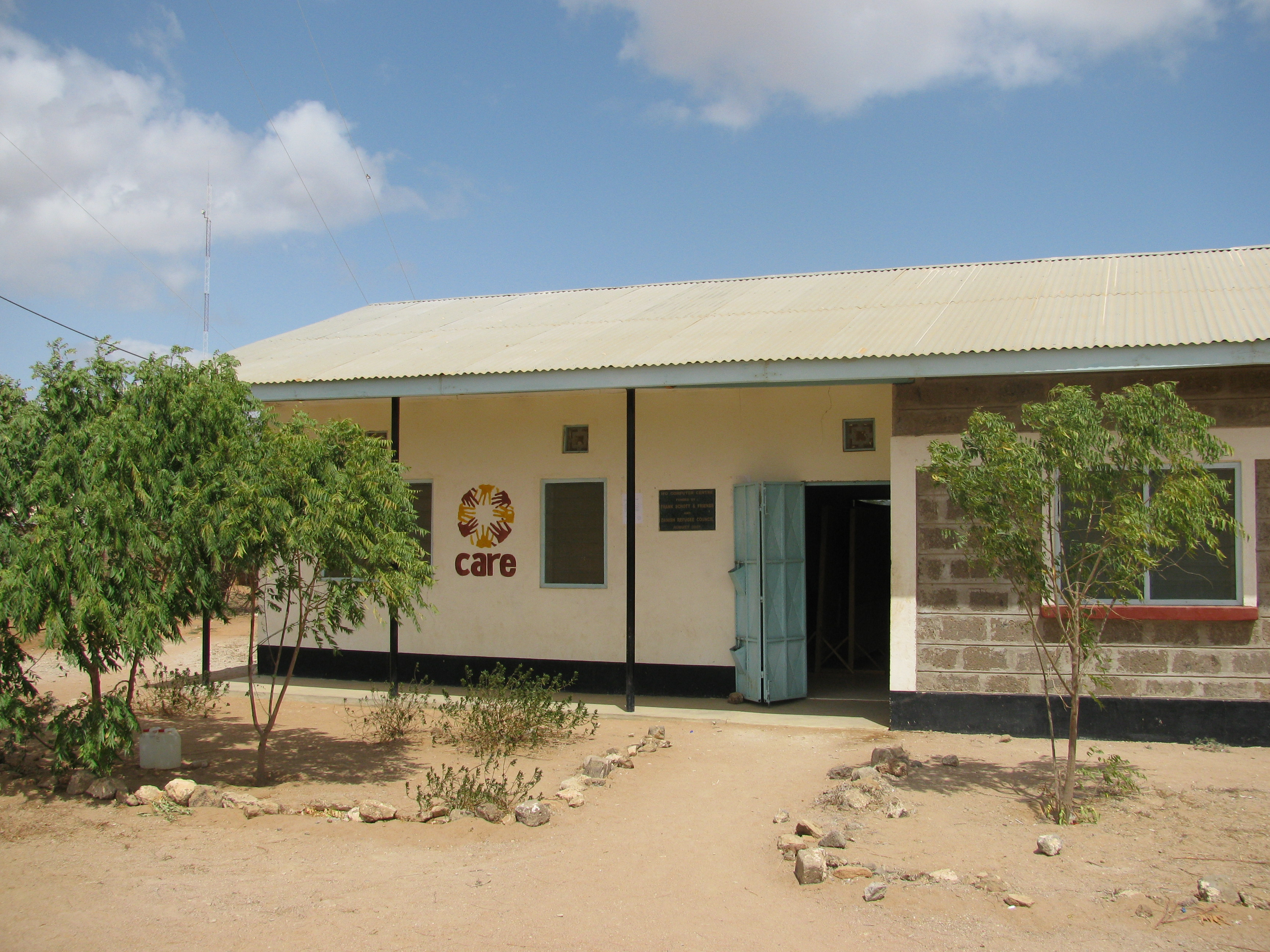
CARE Youth Centre in Dadaab.

The Dadaab camps Dagahaley, Hagadera and Ifo were constructed in 1992. In 2011 and 2013, two new refugee camps were opened when 164,000 new refugees from Somalia arrived, due to severe drought. The Ifo II camp extension was originally constructed in 2007 by the Norwegian Refugee Council, in response to major flooding that destroyed over 2,000 homes in the Ifo refugee camp. However, legal problems with the Kenyan Government prevented Ifo II from fully opening for relocation, until 2011. As of 13 May, Hagadera was the largest of the camps, containing just over 74,744 individuals and 17,490 households. Ifo refugee camp, on the other hand, is the smallest camp with 65,974 refugees. Former Kambioss and Ifo2 refugee camps were closed in April 2017 and May 2018, respectively.

Ifo camp was first settled by refugees from the civil war in Somalia. The UNHCR subsequently made efforts to improve the premises. As the population of the camps in Dadaab grew, UNHCR commissioned the German architect Werner Schellenberg to draw the original design for Dagahaley Camp. Swedish architect Per Iwansson, designed and initiated the establishment of Hagadera camp.

=== Population growth and decline ===
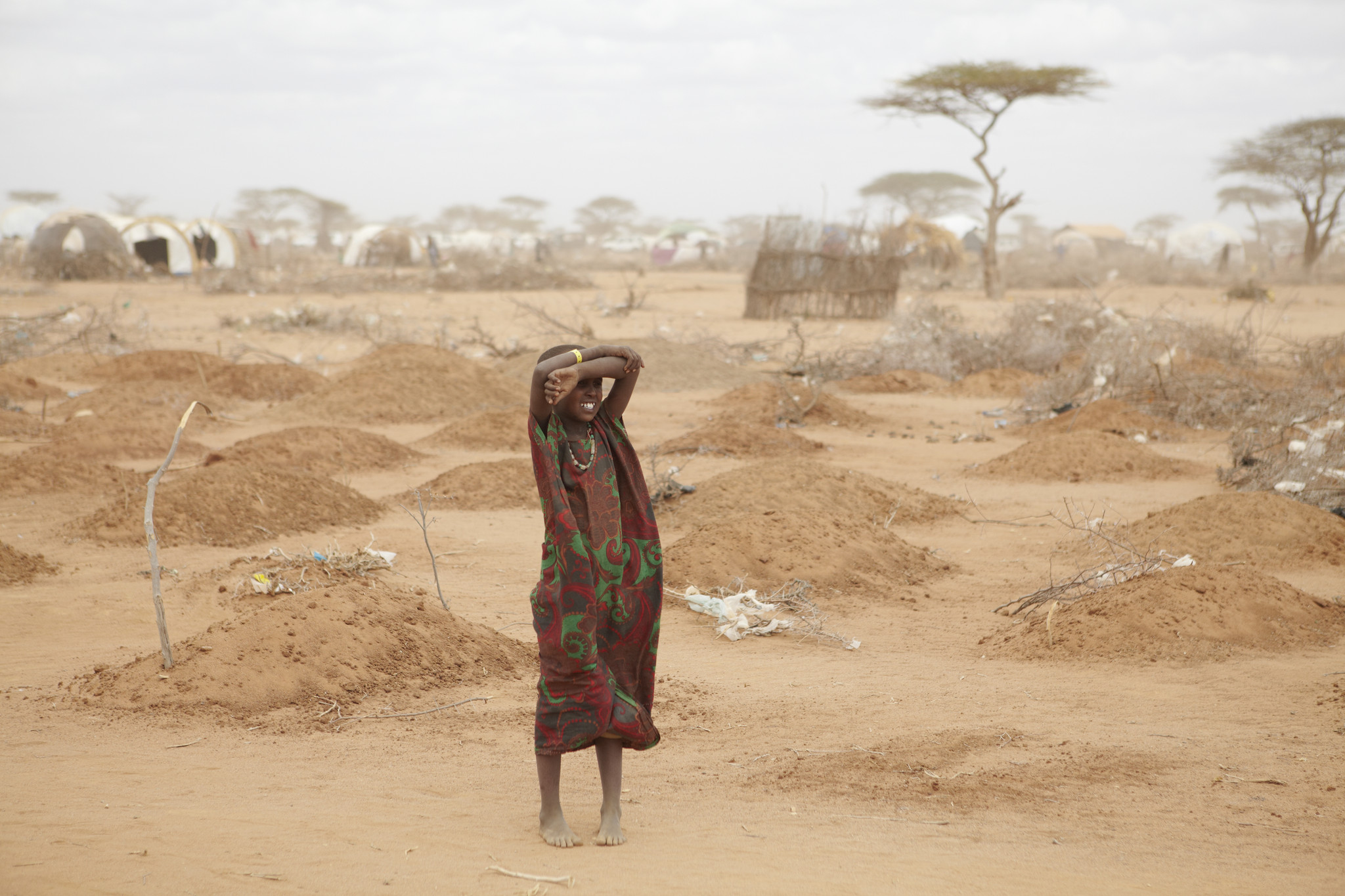
Freshly-dug graves for child victims of the 2011 East Africa drought, Dadaab

People first began arriving at the Dadaab complex shortly after its construction in 1992, with most escaping the Somali Civil War. When refugees arrive at the camp, they are registered and fingerprinted by the Kenyan government. However, the camps themselves are managed by the UNHCR, with other organizations directly in charge of specific aspects of the resident' lives. CARE oversees Water and Sanitation Hygiene as well as warehouse management and the World Food Programme (WFP) distributes food rations. Until 2003, only Médecins Sans Frontières (MSF) provided refugees with access to health-care. Now, healthcare is decentralized. Kenya Red Cross Society (KRCS) provides health care services in ifo refugee camp, International Rescue committee (IRC) in Hagadera and Medicins Sans Frontieres in Dagahley refugee camp. Although refugees arriving at Dadaab receive assistance from each of these organizations, aid is often not immediate due to overcrowding. Other relief organizations include Danish Refugee Agency (DRC), Norwegian Refugee Agency (NRC), Windle International, Lutheran World Federation, and the Center for Victims of Torture. In July 2011, due to a drought in Eastern Africa, over 1,000 people per day were arriving in need of assistance. The influx reportedly placed great strain on the resources, as the capacity of the camps was around 90,000, whereas the camps hosted 439,000 refugees in July 2011 according to the UNHCR. The number was predicted to increase to 500,000 by the end of 2011 according to estimates from Médecins Sans Frontières. Those population figures at the time made Dadaab the largest refugee camp in the world. According to the Lutheran World Federation, military operations in the conflict zones of southern Somalia and a scaling up of relief operations had by early December 2011 greatly reduced the movement of migrants into Dadaab. By 2024, more than 380,000 people lived at Dadaab.

Population of UNHCR refugee locations (2006–2014)
Location	2014	2013	2012	2011	2010	2009	2008	2007	2006
Dagahaley	88,486	104,565	121,127	122,214	93,470	93,179	65,581	39,626	39,526
Hagadera	106,968	114,729	139,483	137,528	101,506	83,518	90,403	70,412	59,185
Ifo	83,750	99,761	98,294	118,972	97,610	79,424	79,469	61,832	54,157

== Demographics ==
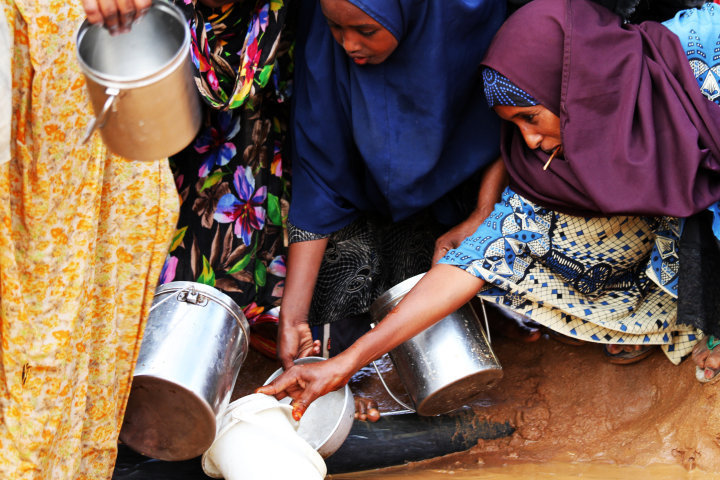
Women distributing water at the base.

Before the UNHCR base was opened, the local town population traditionally consisted of nomadic ethnic Somali pastoralists, who were mainly camel and goat herders. However, since the 1990s, an influx of refugees has dramatically shifted the demographics of the area. Most of the people living in Dadaab have fled various conflicts in the broader Eastern Africa region. The majority have come as a consequence of the civil war in southern Somalia as well as due to droughts. According to Human Rights Watch, most of these displaced persons belong to the Bantu ethnic minority population as well as the Rahanweyn clan. Most of the latter have migrated from the southern Jubba Valley and the Gedo region, while the remainder have arrived from Kismayo, Mogadishu and Bardera.

In 2005, around 97% of registered refugees at Dadaab were Muslims from Somalia. The remainder mainly consisted of Muslims from the Somali Region (Ogaden) in Ethiopia, Ethiopian Christians and Sudanese Christians, totalling 4,000 individuals. While the Muslim minorities did not face any persecution, tensions with the Christian minorities were reportedly high.

According to the UNHCR, 80% of residents were women and children and 95% were Somalia nationals as of mid-2015. Of the registered refugee population from Somalia, the number of men and women is equal, but only 4% of the total population is over the age of sixty. Each year, thousands of children are born in the Dadaab camps. A number of adults have spent their entire lives as refugees in the complex.

In 2024, the camp was still over 97 percent Somali, but was also home to people from Democratic Republic of Congo, Sudan, South Sudan, Burundi, Eritrea and Ethiopia.

== Infrastructure ==
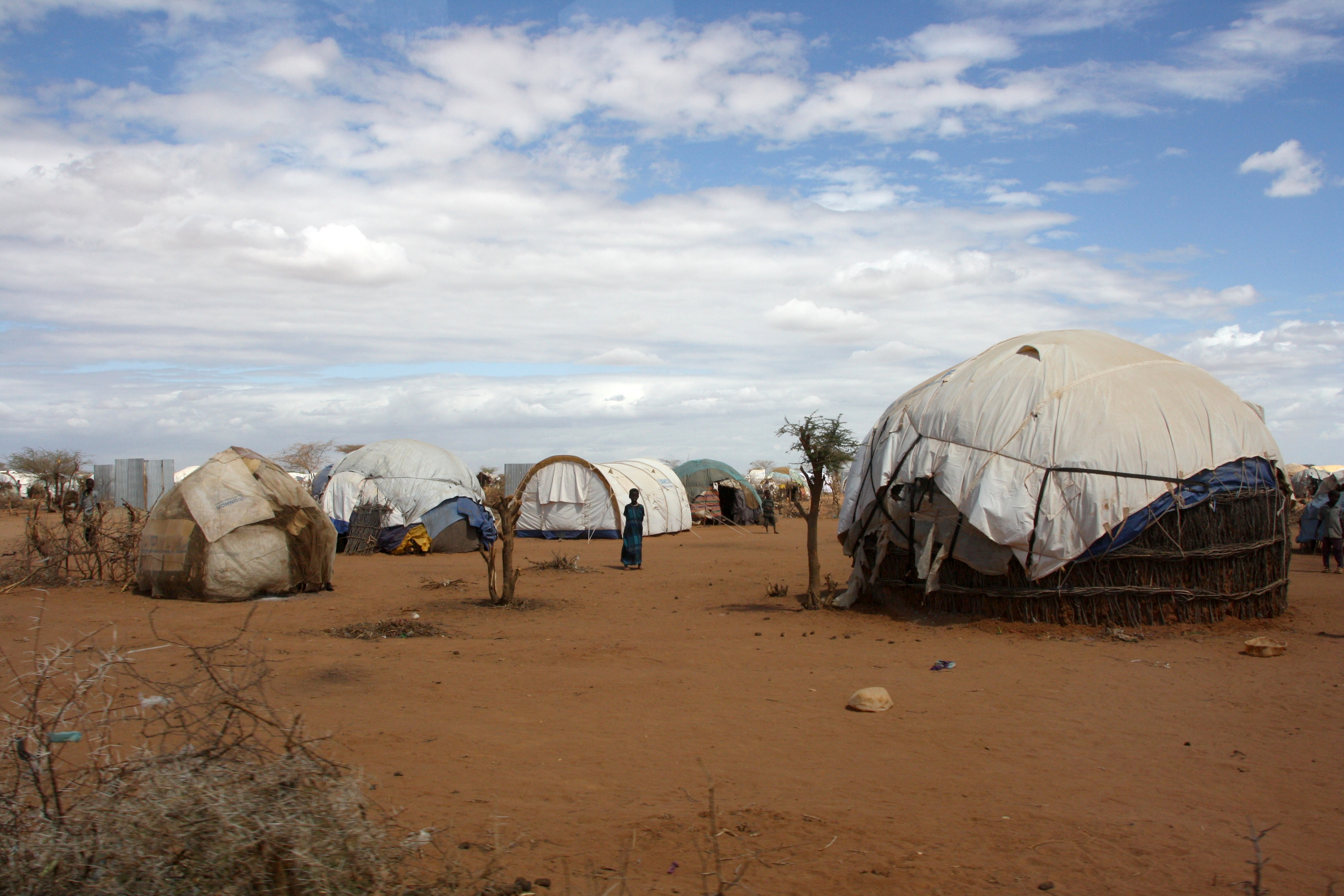
Shelters at the complex.

The Dadaab refugee camp complex is so vast that it has been compared to a city, with urban features such as high population density, economic activity, and concentration of infrastructure. Like a typical urban area, Dadaab contains public service buildings such as schools and hospitals. The Ifo II camp, for example, includes religious spaces, a disability centre, police stations, graveyards, a bus station, and more. In addition, it is designed in a grid-like pattern, with the market on one side and a green belt at the centre of the many lines of tents. Despite these many amenities, however, the camps are crowded and have few signposts, making them confusing and difficult to navigate for new arrivals.

Refugees in Dadaab typically live in tents, which are made of plastic sheeting and distributed by the UNHCR. Although many residents have voluntarily repatriated, the camps are still overcrowded and exceed their intended capacity. By 2024, many residents had built homes to escape the heat of the sun, using mud, metal sheets, and tree branches. On average, four people live together in each household.

== Living conditions ==
With camps filled to capacity, NGOs have worked to improve camp conditions. However, as most urban planners frequently lack the tools to contend with such complex issues, there have been few innovations to improve Dadaab. Opportunities remain such as upgrading and expansion processes for communications infrastructure and environmental management and design. Aside from the infrastructure, some factors affecting quality of life for refugees include access to healthcare and adequate nutrition, education, environmental factors, security, and individuals' economic and legal status.

=== Education ===
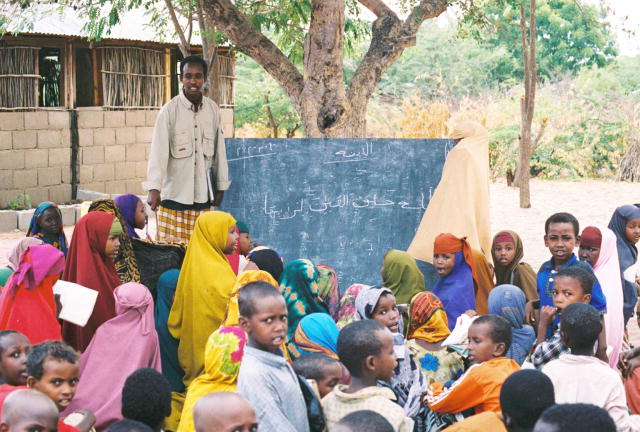
An outdoor school in Dadaab

According to the Kenya Commissioner for Refugees, when migrants first began arriving in Dadaab town from Somalia, they were all educated. An assessment survey completed in 2011 found that access to education in Dadaab was considerably limited, restricting the ability of refugees at the centre to find jobs and become less reliant on aid organizations. Dadaab had only one secondary school; those who managed to be educated there could receive jobs working for aid agencies such as CARE, WFP, or GTZ that distribute resources to refugees. Those who were uneducated could pursue jobs in restaurants or helping load and unload trucks. Many chose other modes of subsistence. In 2011, only around 48% of children in Dadaab were enrolled in school.

In response, the Ministry of Education of Somalia announced that all high school students at the centre who were Somali citizens would be eligible for higher education scholarships. To further improve the education standards, a new European Union-funded project was launched in 2013. The initiative was earmarked for three years, with $4.6 million allocated toward its syllabus. It included new classrooms for all local schools, adult programs, girls' special education, and scholarships for elite students based on merit. 75% of the funds were set aside for refugees at the complex, and 25% were reserved for local constituencies in Lagdera and Fafi.

The camps schools had over 70,000 students in 2024. Schools are built of stone, and use long white tents for additional space.

=== Health care ===
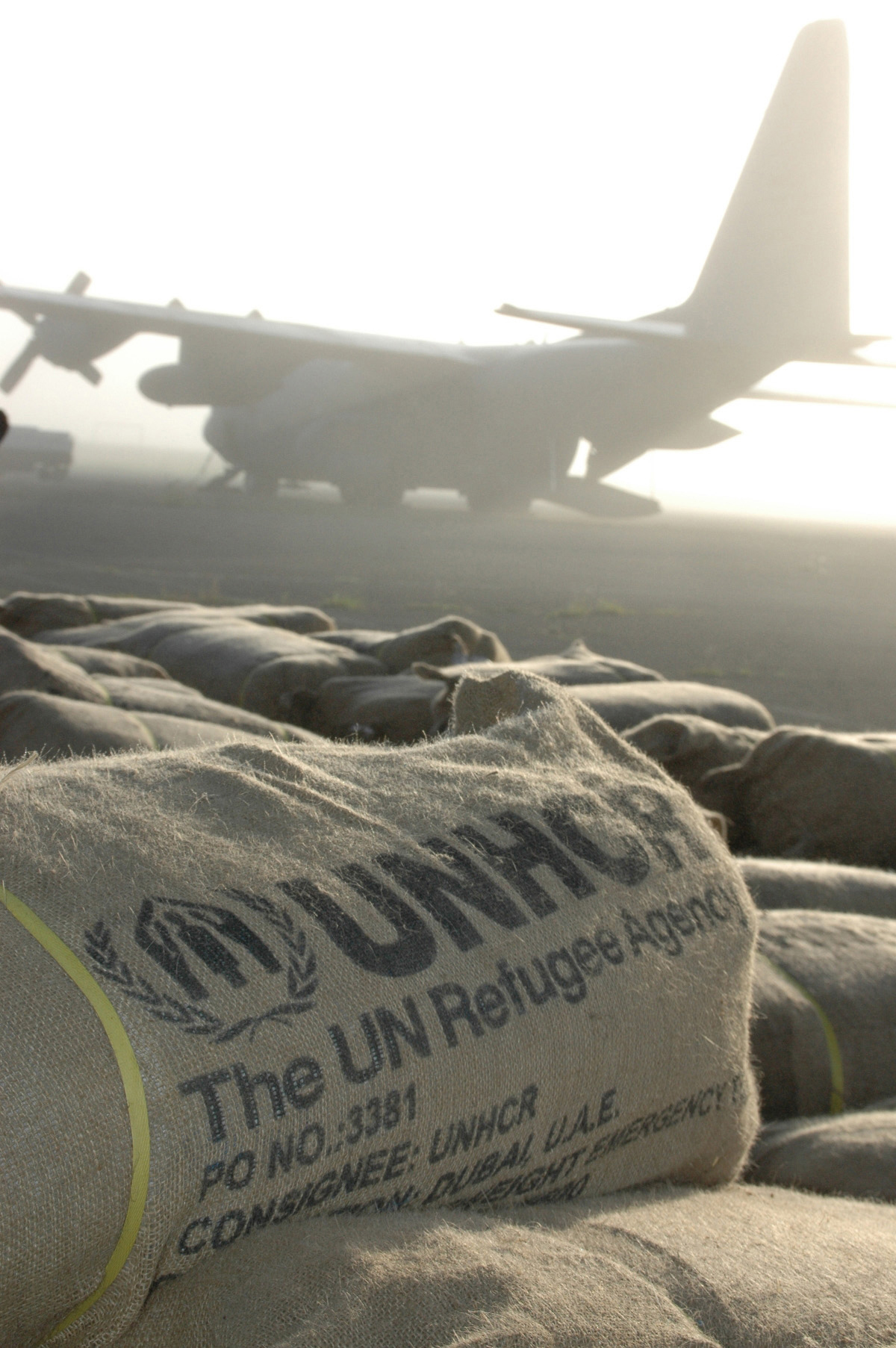
UNHCR packages containing emergency flood supplies.

The German Technical Cooperation (GTZ) provides basic healthcare. On a typical day, around 1,800 refugees get outpatient treatment in hospitals inside the camps. Since 2015, Dadaab has had the largest solar-powered borehole in Africa, which is equipped with 278 solar panels and provides 16,000 residents of the complex with a daily average of about 280,000 litres of water.

Local health risks are complicated by overcrowding. They include diarrhea, pulmonary issues, fever, measles, acute jaundice syndrome, and cholera. Hepatitis E is also a potential issue, as the premises often have substandard sanitary facilities and unclean water.

One reason refugees arrive at the camps is displacement caused by natural disasters. By the end of 2011, more than 25% of residents at the complex had come as a result of a drought in Eastern Africa. Individuals arriving under these conditions were already malnourished, and once at the camps they could experience additional food scarcity. Although malnutrition is a contributing factor to high death rates among children, it has been observed that life expectancy at the complex is positively correlated with years of inhabitation.

Refugees receive food rations containing cereal, legumes, oil, and sugar from the World Food Programme (WFP). Due to overcrowding and lack of resources, they are not eligible for their initial rations until 12 days after arrival, on average. The rations are generally first distributed to children under the age of five because they are at the greatest health risk. Markets at each of the camps have fresh food for sale. However, due to limited income opportunities, most residents are unable to afford them. Some have used innovations such as multi-storey gardens to supplement rations. These require only basic supplies to construct and less water to maintain than normal gardens.

=== Environment ===
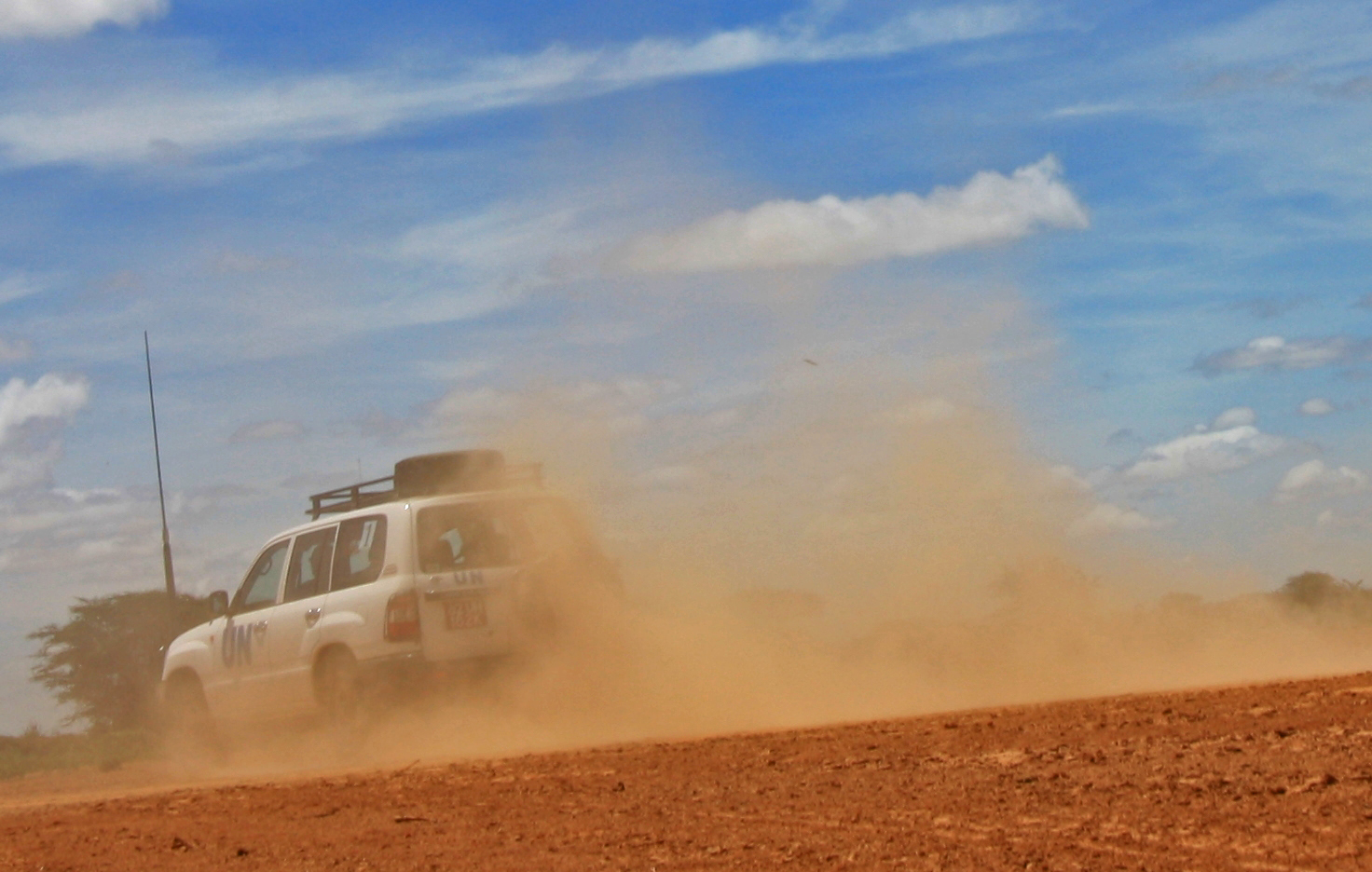
UN vehicle travelling in the arid Dadaab area.

Deforestation has an effect on the lives of Dadaab's residents. Although they are typically required to remain in the camp, residents often have to venture out in search of firewood and water. They are thus obliged to travel farther due to deforestation in nearby areas. This leaves women and girls vulnerable to violence as they journey to and from the complex.

In 2006, flooding severely affected the region. More than 2,000 homes at the Ifo camp were destroyed, forcing the relocation of more than 10,000 refugees. The sole access road to the camp and to the town was also cut off by the floods, impeding the delivery of essential supplies. Humanitarian agencies present in the area worked together to bring vital goods to the area.

In 2011, a drought in Eastern Africa caused a dramatic surge in the camps' population, placing greater strain on resources. By February 2012, aid agencies had shifted their emphasis to recovery efforts, including digging irrigation canals and distributing plant seeds. Long-term strategies by national governments in conjunction with development agencies are believed to offer the most sustainable results. Rainfall had also surpassed expectations and rivers were flowing again, improving the prospects of a good harvest in early 2012.

=== Security ===
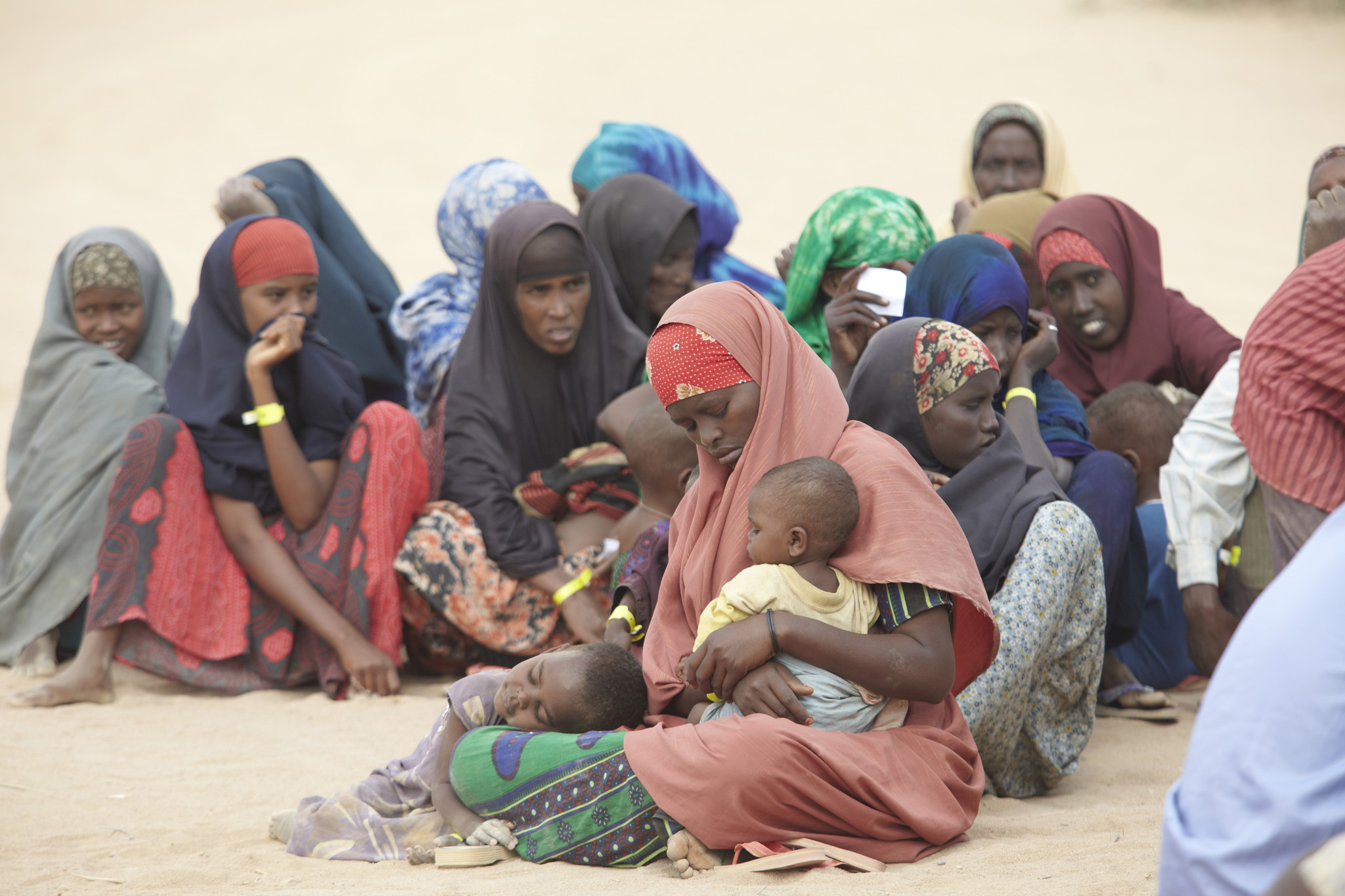
New arrivals wait to get processed

Refugees at the UNHCR centre are not protected by the Government of Kenya (GOK). This has contributed to dangerous living conditions and outbreaks of violence. Because they are not protected under the law and are unable to possess a Kenyan national identification card, refugees are constantly at risk for arrest. Additionally, the Kenyan government screens ethnic Somalis and Ethiopians separately from other residents due to their different physical characteristics. A special category in local police documents is earmarked for "Kenyan-Somalis".

While all refugees at the camp are at risk of violence, the UNHCR and CARE have identified women and children as being particularly vulnerable. They have created a department called 'Vulnerable Women and Children' (VWC) to tackle the issues surrounding violence against these populations. As of August 2015, 60% of Dadaab's total population is under the age of 18, and there are equal numbers of men and women, so women and children make up a significant portion of the camps' demographics. Specifically, the VWC department has identified orphans, widows, divorcees, rape victims and the disabled as the most vulnerable among all women and children. They offer counselling, additional food rations and supplies, and advice on how to earn an income and be financially self-sufficient. However, the effectiveness of these efforts has been questioned, with more research and data being required to identify the best ways to prevent gender-based violence at the complex.

=== Economic and legal status ===
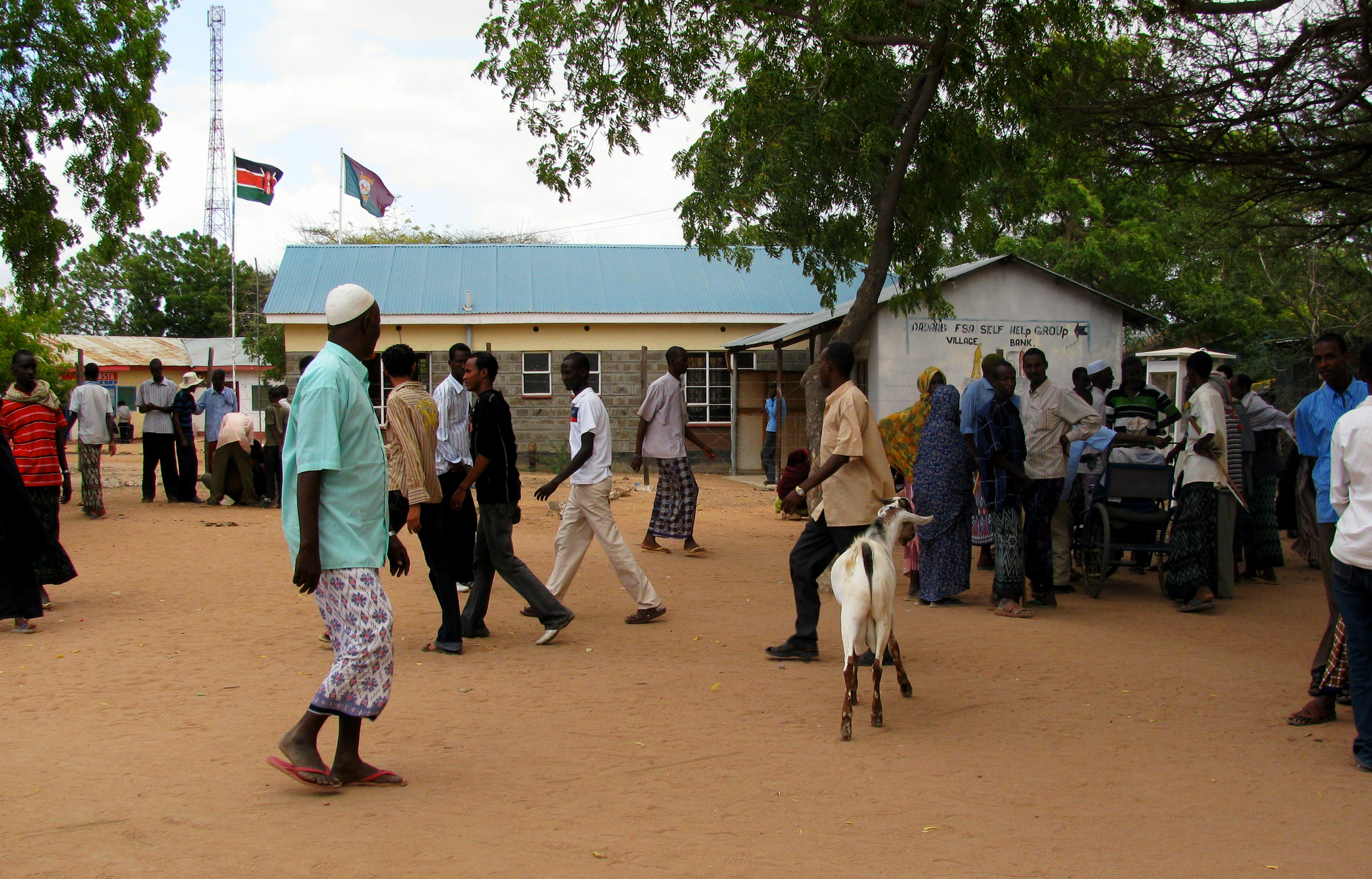
Downtown Dadaab

Operations at the complex are financed by foreign donors. Despite this, public perception in Kenya is that refugees in general cause a strain on the economy. Research, however, has found that many refugees are economically self-sufficient for the most part.

In order to try to further increase the economic independence of refugees living in Dadaab, CARE has initiated microfinance programs, which are particularly important for encouraging women to start their own businesses. However, recent scholarly research has identified some flaws with microfinance, arguing that it has unintended negative consequences. Microfinance typically requires borrowers to pay very high interest rates, which can be detrimental to the poorest if any unexpected problems or crises arise. Living in a community with other economically disadvantaged individuals can also make it difficult to make a profit from a business venture since potential customers are not able to afford the service or product that is being sold. Others have argued that this is beneficial to individuals as a short-term economic solution, but that over the long-term it does not improve the economy as a whole. CARE is also working to create more inclusive markets that refugees are able to participate in to profit off of their newly acquired skills and business ventures.

== Repatriation and resettlement ==
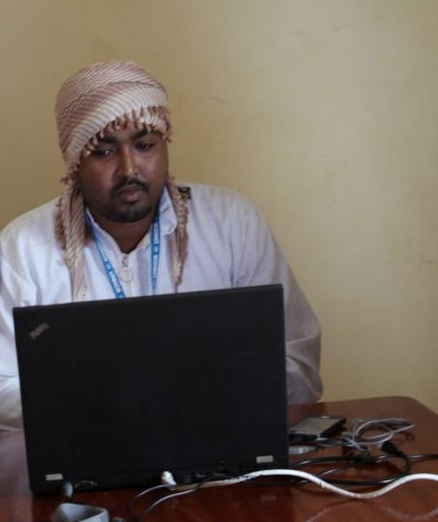
A Somali UNHCR repatriation official.

In November 2013, the Foreign Ministries of Somalia and Kenya and the UNHCR signed a tripartite agreement in Mogadishu paving the way for the voluntary repatriation of Somalia nationals living in Dadaab. Both governments also agreed to form a repatriation commission to coordinate the return of the refugees. This repatriation effort was in response to an attack on the Westgate shopping mall in Nairobi, and belief that Al-Shabaab, the militant group responsible for the attack, was using Dadaab to recruit new members.

In 2014, the UNHCR assisted 3,562 refugees originating from Somalia to resettlement from Kenya. Slightly over 2,000 individuals returned to the Luuq, Baidoa and Kismayo districts in southern Somalia under the repatriation project. Despite these government endorsed repatriation schemes, the majority of the returnees have instead repatriated independently. By February 2014, around 80,000 to 100,000 residents had voluntarily repatriated to Somalia, significantly decreasing the base's population.

Following the Garissa University College attack in April 2015, which resulted in 148 deaths, the Kenyan government asked the UNHCR to repatriate the remaining refugees to a designated area in Somalia within three months. The proposed closure was reportedly spurred by fear that Al-Shabaab was still recruiting members from Dadaab. Some individuals reported that the anxiety caused by the Kenyan government repeatedly threatening to shut down the camps was enough to convince them to leave. Without job availability or reliable access to resources, greater opportunities existed for them outside of Dadaab. Others questioned the government's rationale for closing the camps, dismissing the claims of terrorist elements as baseless and refusing to depart. The three-month ultimatum passed without Dadaab being closed.

The Federal Government of Somalia and UNHCR confirmed that the repatriation would continue to be voluntary in accordance with the tripartite agreement, and that eight districts in Somalia from where most of the individuals had come had officially been designated as safe for repatriation. However, the Kenyan government has intermittently threatened to close down the Dadaab and Kakuma refugee camps. In May 2016, it declared that it had already disbanded the local Department of Refugee Affairs as part of the move, citing national security interests as the primary reason behind the forced repatriations. The UNCHR regards the Kenyan authorities' unilateral declaration as irresponsible, and has sought to broker a deal to ensure that the complex remains open. The threat of closure by the Kenyan government is believed to be a ploy on its part to leverage more foreign donations. It also comes as the Somali federal authorities are challenging the Kenyan government at the International Court of Justice over demarcation of their respective territorial waters.

== See also ==
- Liboi
