= Ifo Refugee Camp =

Refugee Camp in Kenya

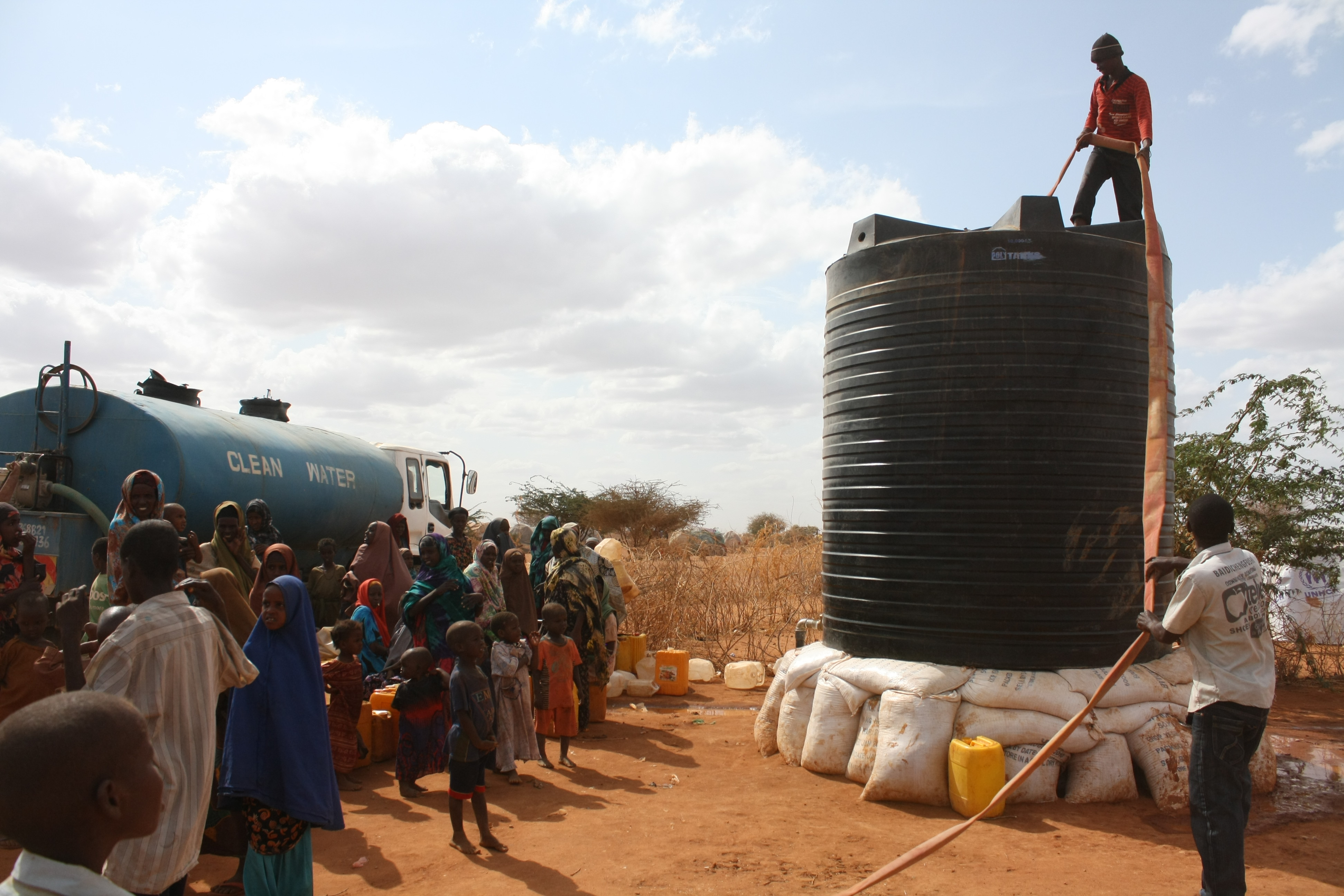
Refugees at IFO camp await the installation of a new water tank

Ifo Refugee Camp is a refugee camp in Dadaab in Kenya. It was established in 1991 with initial goal of accommodating refugees from Somalia due to the civil war which was ongoing.

== Background ==
It is among the three refugee camps in Dadaab, Garissa county in Eastern Kenya, 100 km from the Somalia border. It covers an area of 12.3 km^{2} (4.7 sq mi). Ifo refugee camp is a home to refugees from ten countries, namely Somalia, Ethiopia, South Sudan, DRC, Burundi, Uganda, Rwanda, Sudan, Tanzania and Eritrea.

As of 1 August 2015, Ifo refugee camp had a population of 84,181 refugees with 41,992 as male and 42,189 were female.

In 2011, Ifo II refugee camp was constructed to reduce on overcrowding.

The Ifo Refugee camp is also mentioned in A Long Walk to Water where Salva Dut stays.

== Schools ==
Ifo refugee camp has eight primary schools and two secondary schools.

== Active partners ==
Ifo refugee camp has various partners who offer various services to the refugees.

Partner	Service
Action Contre Faim (ACF)	Infant and youth child nutrition
Center for Victims of Torture	Psychosocial support
CARE	WASH, logistics, warehousing
World Food Programme (WFP)	food
UNICEF	education
UNOCHA	humanitarian work coordination
Save the Children International	child protection
Film Aid International	community communication
Peace Winds Japan	shelter
Refugee Consortium Kenya	legal assistance, protection and monitoring
Handicap international	persons with special needs
Islamic relief	health and primary education
National Council of churches in Kenya	reproductive health and HIV services, peace education, support persons with special needs especially very old people
Relief Reconstruction and Development Organization	environment protection, household energy, and host community projects
Associazione Volontari Italiani Sangue	education infrastructure, teacher training

== See also ==
- Dadaab Refugee Complex
- Kakuma Refugee Camp
