= Laurence Tosi =

American entrepreneur, investor, and philanthropist

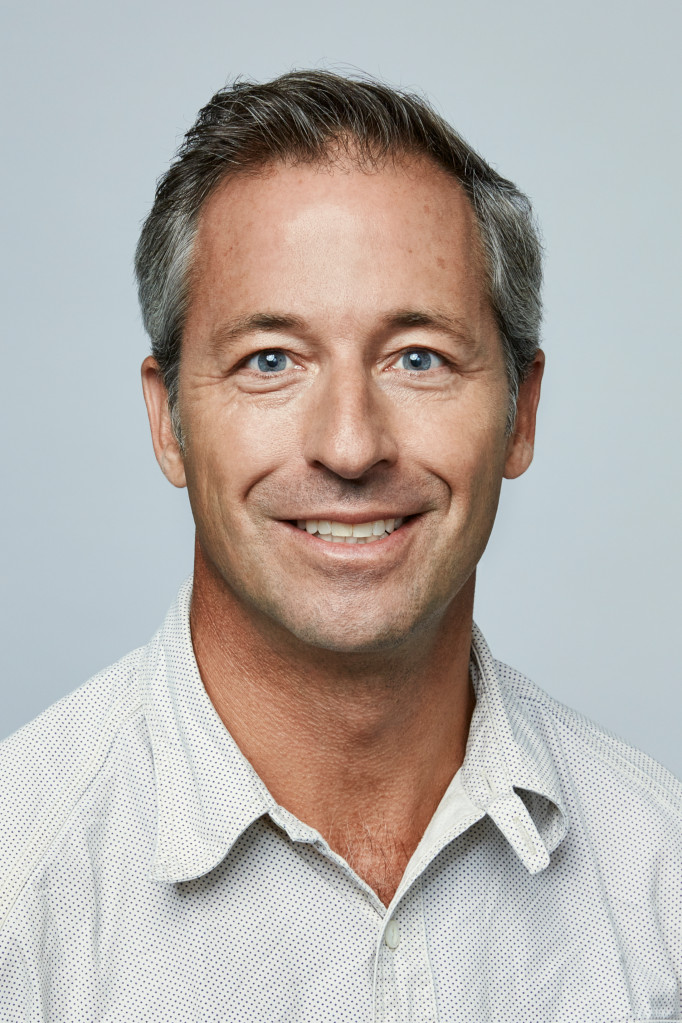
- Tosi in 2015
- Born: Laurence A. Tosi; 1968 (age 57–58)
- Other name: L.T.
- Education: Georgetown University (BA, JD, MBA)
- Occupations: Investor, business executive
- Known for: Former CFO of The Blackstone Group and Airbnb
- Title: Managing Partner and Founder of WestCap
- Board member of: GoodLeap, Hopper, Flyr

Laurence A. Tosi (born 1968) is an American entrepreneur, investor, and philanthropist. He is currently a managing partner of WestCap Group, a private equity firm he founded that has around $9 billion in assets under management. Prior to dedicating his time to WestCap, Tosi served as the CFO of Airbnb and of The Blackstone Group and held several roles at Merrill Lynch. On the boards of companies such as Hopper, he is also a co-founder of Ipreo Holdings LLC and the carbon capture company Deep Sky.

== Early life and education ==
Laurence Tosi was born on February 8, 1968. He attended Georgetown University, graduating with a Bachelor of Arts in 1990 before earning a joint JD and MBA in 1994.

Tosi worked to put himself through Georgetown, which he described as a financial struggle. He later became a major donor to the school and to its 1789 scholarship fund.

== Business career ==
=== GE and Merrill Lynch (1990s-2008) ===
After law school, Tosi practiced litigation and corporate law at Donovan, Leisure, Newton & Irvine; and then went to work for General Electric as the director of business development for GE's CNBC and NBC divisions. He worked with GE until 1999.

He was with Merrill Lynch & Co as global head of corporate development from 1999 to 2007, where according to Reuters he "managed many of the firm's strategic acquisitions and investments." From 2004 to 2007, he was Merrill Lynch's principal accounting officer for global finance, while simultaneously working as chief operating officer (COO) of global markets and investment banking. While at Merrill Lynch he co-founded Ipreo Holdings LLC, a financial provider. Tosi was CFO of Merrill's trading and investment banking division until 2008, also serving as Merrill Lynch's finance director and a senior vice president.

=== CFO at Blackstone Group (2008-2015) ===
In June 2008, he was hired as chief financial officer (CFO) of the Blackstone Group. While at the company, he used Blackstone funds to help found iLevel, a data gathering tool that Blackstone spun off in 2009. He also headed the firm's Innovations Fund. In 2011, Tosi was reportedly offered the role of CFO at Apple by Steve Jobs, as Apple apparently had significant cash reserves and felt that Tosi would bring acquisition experience. Tosi turned the offer down to remain with Blackstone. It was reported in 2012 that Tosi was on a shortlist of Blackstone senior executives being groomed to potentially become CEO when Stephen Schwarzman retired. According to the New York Times, at Blackstone, Tosi along with executives such as Joseph Baratta and Jonathan D. Gray "played a crucial role in transforming the firm from a deal-driven private equity shop to a diversified asset management company."

Tosi created an internal investment trust at Blackstone, and by 2014 the trust had invested in companies such as Ipreo, which Tosi had co-founded while at Merrill Lynch. Between 2008 and 2015, the press credited Tosi with overseeing an increase of Blackstone's assets under management from $119 billion to $333 billion. On August 7, 2015, he was succeeded as Blackstone's CFO by Michael S. Chae.

=== CFO at Airbnb (2015-2018) ===
Tosi served as CFO at Airbnb starting August 2015, moving to Silicon Valley in California. At Airbnb he led payments, customer service, and corporate development. According to the Wall Street Journal, his tenure at Airbnb was "largely marked by fundraising and expansion into new geographic markets." In 2016, he joined investors such as Andreessen Horowitz and Vikram Pandit in a funding round for the Palo Alto real estate technology company Point. Tosi then oversaw Airbnb's acquisition of the rental website Luxury Retreats for $300 million in 2017.

According to Bloomberg, while at Airbnb, Tosi also "quietly" created an internal hedge fund within the company's finance department, "mimicking the treasury fund he ran at Blackstone" and using a "portion of capital from the balance sheet to buy stocks, currencies, and fixed-income securities." The fund represented 30% of Airbnb's cash flow in 2017, and at that time reportedly made the company around $5 million per month. While at Airbnb, Tosi helped the startup become profitable, according to CNBC, and Airbnb exceeded financial projections in 2017 with $93 million in profit on $2.6 billion in revenue. Tosi left Airbnb in 2018 to dedicate more time and energy to his investment fund, Weston Capital Partners, as well as to a number of boards seats.

=== WestCap (2019-present) ===
Tosi founded Weston Capital Partners, his personal investment fund, in 1997, making early investments in startup companies such as Airbnb and Tradeweb. The firm closed a US$750 million fund in 2018, and shortly afterwards, Weston Capital Partners became WestCap Investment Partners LLC, or WestCap, with Tosi as founder and managing partner. With offices in New York and San Francisco and investors such as Caisse de depot et placement du Quebec, the private equity firm retained a focus on technology-oriented startups. In October 2020, it was reported that Tosi's firm was in the final stages of raising another $750 million fund and had received about $1.2 billion of investor interest to date.

Through WestCap, he has invested in StubHub and Skillz, and in 2020, Tosi invested in Hopper. WestCap had around $9 billion in assets under management by the end of 2021. In 2021, he invested in Goodleap and iCapital, and he was a co-founder of Deep Sky in September 2022. Under Tosi, in 2025 WestCap invested in Addepar and the travel startup Flyr.

== Boards ==
As of 2025, Tosi is on the boards of the online travel agency Hopper Inc., the travel startup Flyr, and GoodLeap, which he joined in 2021. He was previously on the board at Georgetown University, and as of 2025 served on one of the university's financial subcommittees.

== See also ==
- Notable alumni of Donovan, Leisure, Newton & Irvine
- List of Georgetown University business alumni
- Notable people from Rye, New Hampshire
