= Hayes Barnard =

American entrepreneur and philanthropist

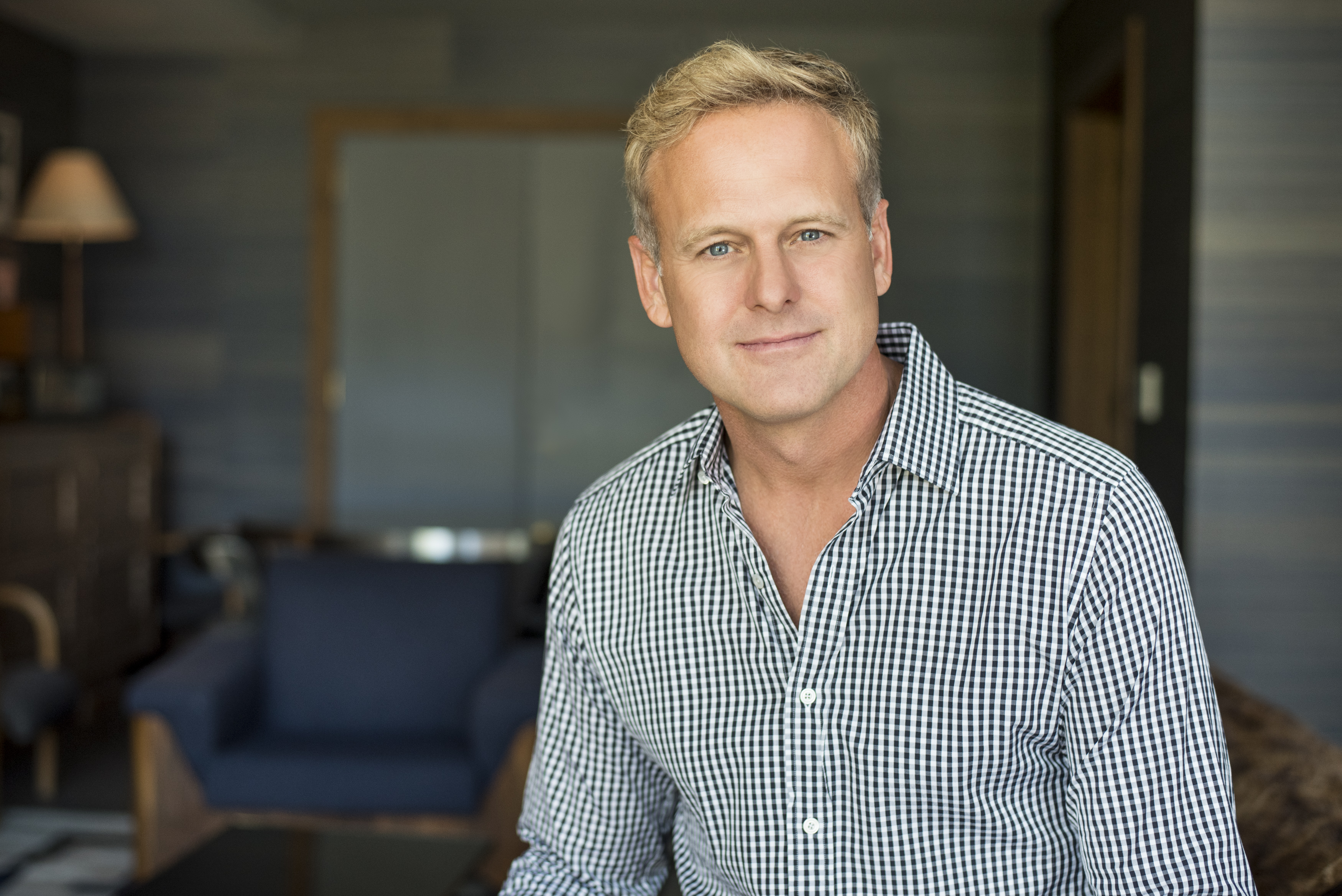
- Born: Creve Coeur, Missouri
- Education: University of Missouri(BA)
- Occupations: Founder, Chairman, CEO of GoodLeap; Founder, Chairman, CEO of GivePower
- Years active: 2003–present
- Children: 3
- Website: goodleap.com givepower.org

Hayes Barnard is an American billionaire entrepreneur. He is the founder, chairman, and CEO of GoodLeap, a sustainable energy financing company. Barnard is also the founder, chairman, and CEO of GivePower, a nonprofit that facilitates solar powered projects to provide clean water and energy systems to underserved communities.

== Early life and education ==
Barnard was born and raised in Creve Coeur, Missouri, a suburb of St. Louis. His father left when Barnard was three years old. Barnard graduated from the University of Missouri with a degree in management and marketing. He won a football scholarship to Central Missouri State, but was injured during his freshman year and subsequently transferred to the University of Missouri, where he graduated with a degree in management and marketing.

== Career ==
In 1995 Barnard went to San Francisco to be a part of the hi-tech boom. His first jobs were manning booths at trade shows. He then went on to work at Oracle as a sales executive. In September 2003, Barnard founded Paramount Equity Mortgage (later renamed to Loanpal and subsequently rebranded to GoodLeap), one of the first to provide online residential home loans. In 2008, he founded Paramount Solar, a subsidiary of Paramount Equity Mortgage, and became CEO. In 2024, GoodLeap, announced that it had financed more than $20 billion in sustainable home-improvement loans, highlighting the company's ongoing growth in the clean-energy sector.

In 2011, Guthy-Renker became an investor and business partner assisting in the growth of Paramount Equity Mortgage and Paramount Solar. Barnard and Guthy-Renker also partnered with SolarCity. In 2013, Paramount Solar was acquired by SolarCity for $120 million and Barnard became SolarCity's Chief Revenue Officer. As Chief Revenue Officer, he managed a team of 8,000. He was also responsible for the company's growth and grew megawatts installed 300% from 2013 to 2015.

In 2014, Barnard founded GivePower while at SolarCity. GivePower is a 501(c)(3) nonprofit organization that develops clean water and energy systems in underserved communities in developing countries. GivePower has developed water and energy systems in 17 countries, including communities in Africa, Asia, and Latin America. In 2018, Barnard's non-profit organization built a solar-powered desalination system in Kiunga, Kenya that produces 19,800 gallons of fresh drinking water a day. The organization also assisted the Sioux Nation in North Dakota in developing a 300-kilowatt solar farm in North Dakota, the first solar farm in the state.

In 2016, Barnard left SolarCity and took on the role of chairman and CEO of Loanpal, a financial technology platform that provides financing for clean energy products.

In 2020, Barnard started an asset management fund, GoodFinch.

In 2021, Loanpal rebranded to GoodLeap, "good for life, earth and prosperity."

== Personal life ==
Barnard lives in Austin, Texas with his wife and three children.

In October 2022, Barnard ranked #271 on the Forbes 400 list with an estimated net worth of $4 billion. Forbes also awarded Barnard a self-made score of 10 out of 10, a score received by 28 out of the 400 list members.

In 2021, the USC Marshall School of Business established the Hayes Barnard Sustainability Fellowship, an initiative designed to support MBA students dedicated to sustainable business practices. Funded by Barnard, the fellowship provides financial assistance to students pursuing sustainability-focused projects and research.

In May 2023, Barnard delivered the keynote address at the 140th commencement of the University of Texas at Austin.
