= Fahim Yasin Twaha =

Kenyan politician

Former Governor of Lamu County
- In office 22 August 2017 – 11 August 2022
- Deputy: Aboud Bwana Abdulhakim
- Preceded by: Issa Timamy

Member of Parliament, Lamu West Constituency with NARC-Kenya
- Incumbent
- Assumed office 1997

Personal details
- Party: Jubilee Party of Kenya

Fahim Yasin Twaha (14 May 1968) is the 2nd and former governor of Lamu County in Kenya, out of office since 11 August 2022.
