= Lamu East Constituency =

Kenyan electoral constituency

Lamu East
- Constituency
- Lamu East Constituency within Lamu County

- Lamu County within Kenya
- County: Lamu County
- Population: 22,258
- Area: 2,338 km^{2} (902.7 sq mi)

Current constituency
- Party: JP
- Member of Parliament: Ruweida Mohamed Obo
- Wards: 3

Lamu East Constituency is an electoral constituency in Kenya. It is one of two constituencies in Lamu County. The constituency has six wards, all electing ward representatives for the Lamu County Assembly.

== Members of Parliament ==
Elections	MP	Party	Notes
1966	Abubakar H. M. Madhubuti	KANU	One-party system
1969	Abubakar H. M. Madhubuti	KANU	One-party system
1970	Mzamil Omar Mzamil	KANU	By-elections, One-party system
1974	Abubakar H. M. Madhubuti	KANU	One-party system
1979	Mzamil Omar Mzamil	KANU	One-party system
1983	Mzamil Omar Mzamil	KANU	One-party system
1988	Abubakar H. M. Madhubuti	KANU	One-party system
1992	Abu Chiaba	KANU	
1997	Mohamed Salim Hashim	KANU	
2002	Abu Chiaba	KANU	
2007	Abu Chiaba	PNU	
2013	Shariff Ali Athman	UDF	11th Parliament of Kenya
2017	Shariff Ali Athman	Jubilee	12th Parliament of Kenya
2022	Ruweida Mohamed Obo	Jubilee	13th Parliament of Kenya

== Locations and wards ==
Locations	Population
Basuba	873
Faza	2,166
Kiunga	1,040
Kizingitini	1,733
Mbwajumwali	2,903
Ndau	2,205
Pate	2,144
Siyu	2,137
Tchundwa	3,221
Total	18,422
1999 census.

Ward	Registered Voters
Basuba	311
Faza / Tchundwa	2,971
Kiunga	1,107
Kizingitini West	3,646
Ndau	1,042
Siyu / Pate	2,558
Total	11,635
*September 2005.
