= Ruweida Obo =

Kenyan politician

Honourable Ruweida Mohamed Obo MP

Member of the Kenyan Parliament for Lamu East Constituency
- Incumbent
- Assumed office 2017
- Preceded by: Sharif Ali Athman
- Constituency: Lamu East

County Woman Representative
- In office 2017–2022
- Succeeded by: Monica Mūthoni Marubu
- Constituency: Lamu County
- Preceded by: Abdalla Shakilla Mohamed

Personal details
- Born: 1978 (age 47–48) Pate Island, Lamu County, Kenya
- Party: JP; Azimio La Umoja
- Education: Moi University; University of Nairobi
- Occupation: Politician; Pilot

Ruweida Mohamed Obo was born in 1978, in Pate Island, Lamu County. She is a Kenyan politician and the first woman elected as MP for Lamu East Constituency.

== Early life and education ==
Born in Pate Island, Lamu County, she attended Ndau Primary School in Lamu and later transferred to Ngomeni Primary School in Kilifi County. She attended Coast Girls' High School in Mombasa County for her O-levels education. She received her private pilot's licence from the Kenya School of Flying in October 2002. She worked as the line captain at Mombasa Air Safari for 13 years.

In 2017, she obtained a BSc in Aviation Management from the University of Nairobi. In 2022 she obtained a BBM from Moi University.

== Career ==
=== Aviation ===
From 2000 to 2005, Obo worked as a pilot for Kijipwa Aviation. In 2006 she became a first officer for Mombasa Air Safari, later becoming a line captain in 2008. In 2015, she founded Obo Aviation and has since served as its CEO.

As a pilot, she has worked in transporting relief supplies to South Sudan.

=== Politics ===
In 2013, Obo ran for Lamu county woman representative under the TNA party but she was unsuccessful, losing to Shakila Abdalah Mohamed. In 2017, Obo ran again for Lamu county woman representative under the Jubilee Party, defeating the incumbent Shakila Abdalah Mohamed. Following her election, she served as the vice chairperson of the Committee on Regional Integration at the National Assembly.

In 2022, Obo ran in the election for Lamu East Constituency MP under the Jubilee Party. She became the first woman to be elected Member of Parliament for Lamu East Constituency, defeating the incumbent Sharif Athman Ali.
