= Libat, Kenya =

Libat
- Location within Kenya
- Coordinates: 0.78°S 40.92°E
- Country: Kenya
- County: Garissa County
- Time zone: UTC+3 (EAT)

Libat is a settlement in Kenya's Garissa County.

Around 2016, a plan was conceived to build a wall to prevent cross-border attacks from Somalia. One of the proposed sections was a 445 kilometre wall extending from Elwak to Libat. Another was a 105 kilometre wall from Libat to Kiunga.
