= Lamu County =

Coordinates: 2°18′0″S 40°42′0″E

- County
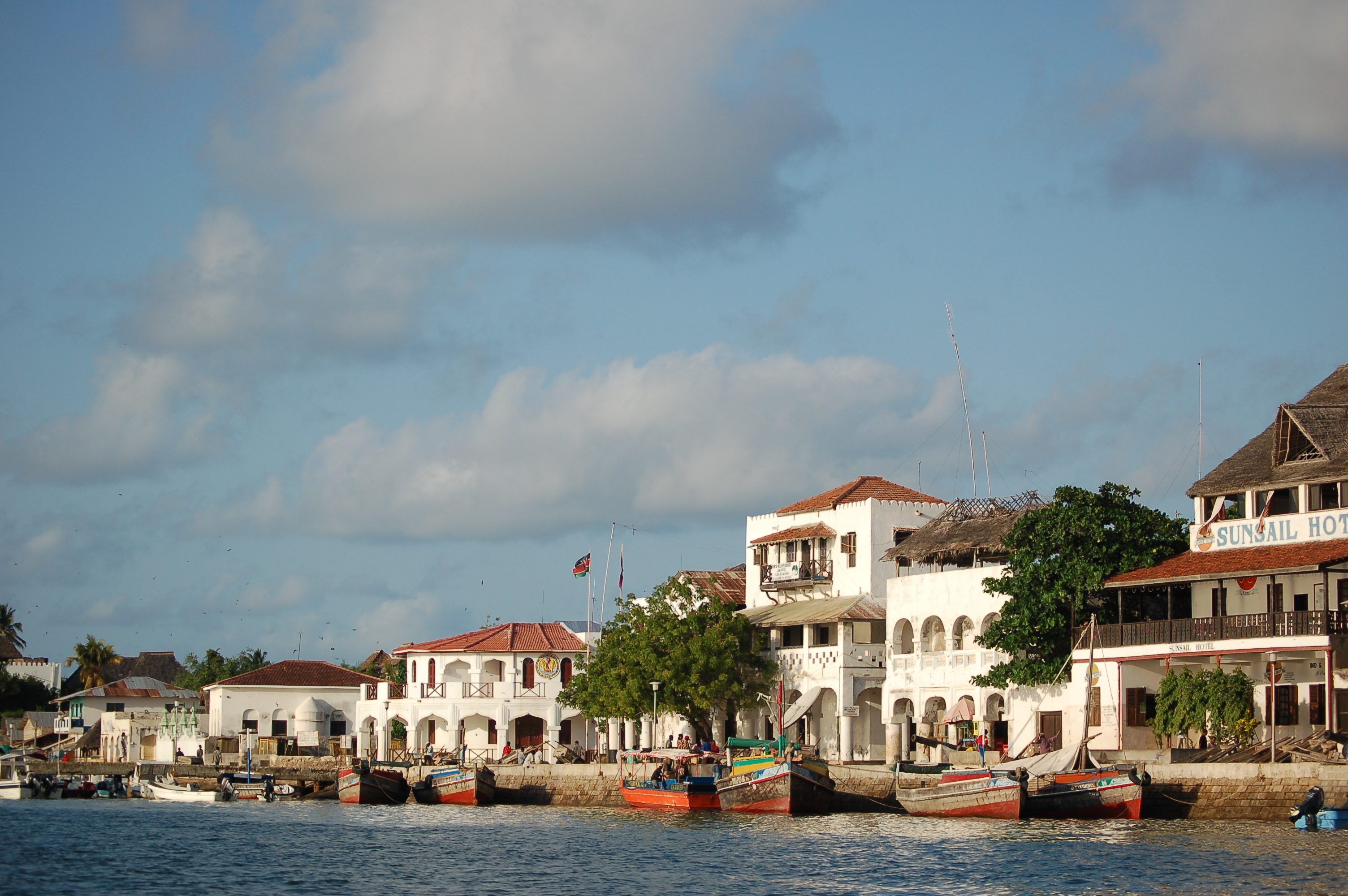
- Lamu, Lamu Island

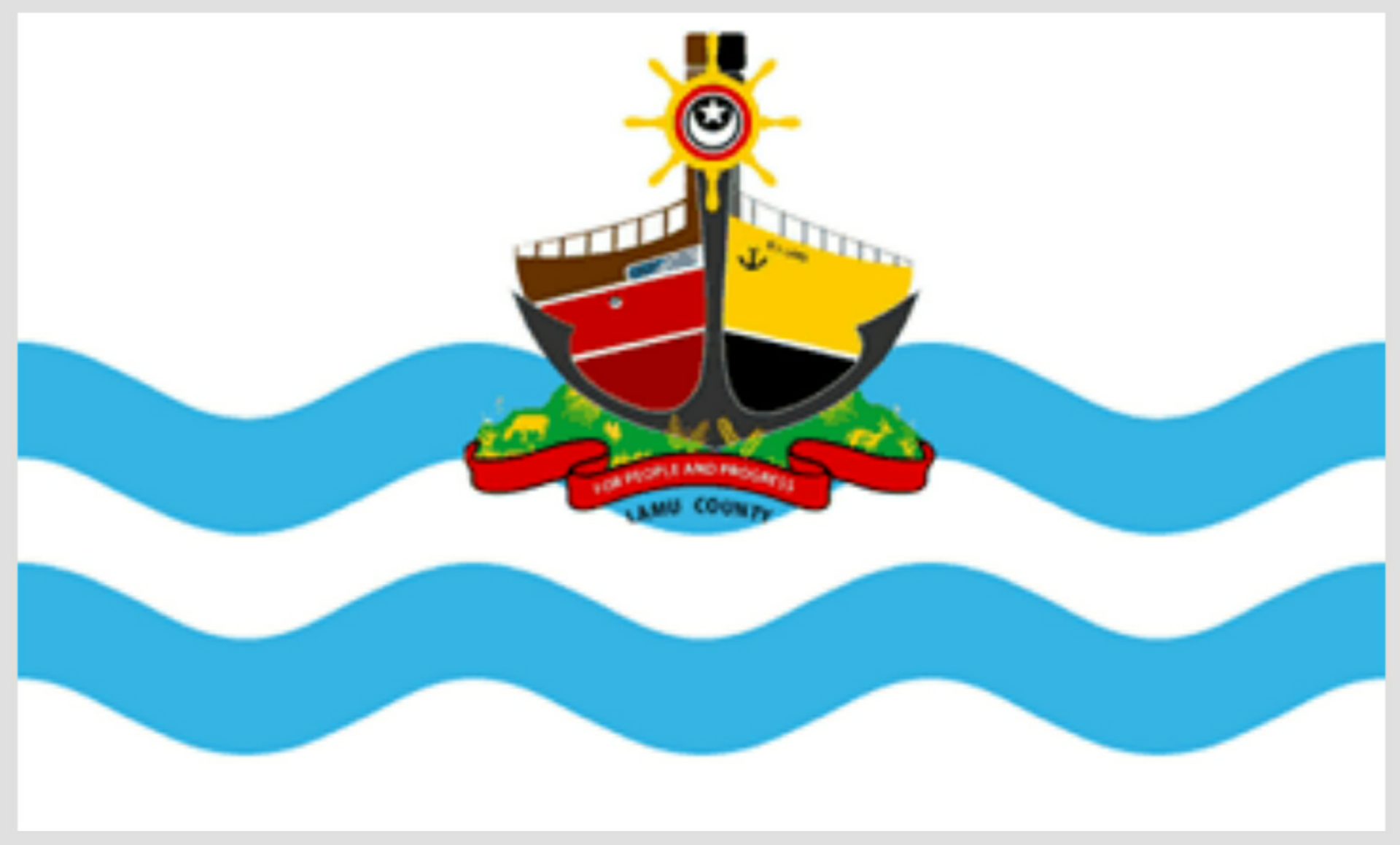
- Flag

- Location in Kenya
- Country: Kenya
- Formed: 4 March 2013
- Capital: Lamu

Government
  - Governor: Issa Timamy

Area
  - Total: 6,273.1 km^{2} (2,422.1 sq mi)
  - Land: 6,273.1 km^{2} (2,422.1 sq mi)
- Elevation: 110 m (360 ft)

Population (2019)
  - Total: 143,920
  - Density: 22.942/km^{2} (59.421/sq mi)

GDP (PPP)
  - GDP: ▲$935.7 million (2022) (44th)
  - Per capita: ▲$5,736 (2022) (13th)

GDP (nominal)
  - GDP: ▲$343 Million (2022) (44th)
  - Per Capita: ▲$2,106 (2022) (13th)
- Time zone: UTC+3 (EAT)
- Website: www.lamu.go.ke

Lamu County is a county in Kenya located along the North Coast of the country and is one of the six Coastal Counties in Kenya. Its capital is the town of Lamu. It borders Tana River County to the southwest, Garissa County to the north, Somalia to the northeast, and the Indian Ocean to the south. It is the smallest county in Kenya by population.

The county has a land surface of 6,273.1 km^{2} (2,422.1 sq mi), including the mainland and over 65 islands that form the Lamu Archipelago. The total length of the coastline is 130 km (81 mi), while the land water mass area stands at 308 km^{2} (119 sq mi).

== Demographics ==
The county is made up of a cosmopolitan population composed of communities such as Aweer, Oromo, Somalis, Swahilis, Arabs, Kore, Kikuyu, and other migrant communities from all over the country. The county had a total population of 143,920, of which 76,103 were males, 67,813 females and 4 intersex persons during the 2019 census of Kenya. There were 37,963 households with an average household size of 3.7 persons per household and a population density of 23 people per square kilometre.

The LAPSSET project was in 2016 expected to attract a huge migrant population, estimated at over one million people. This will certainly overstretch the county's social services, necessitating commensurate development planning for adequate service provision.

Historical population
Year	Pop.	±%
1979	42,299	—
1989	56,783	+34.2%
1999	72,686	+28.0%
2009	101,539	+39.7%
2019	143,920	+41.7%

=== Religion ===
1. Christian (47.0%)
2. Muslim (51.0%)
3. Other Religions (1.00%)
4. Atheist (1.00%)
Religion in Lamu County

== Administrative and political units ==
=== Administrative units ===
The county has 2 constituencies: Lamu West and Lamu East. These two also consist of the two districts referred to as the sub-counties in Lamu County. Lamu West has Amu Mkomani, Shela, Hindi, Mkunumbi, Hongwe, Bahari and Witu Divisions while Lamu East has Faza, Basuba and Kiunga Divisions. There are 10 wards, 23 locations, and 38 sub-locations in the county.

Administrative divisions
Division	Population*	Urban pop.*	Headquarters
Amu	17,310	12,839	Lamu
Faza	7,474	0	Faza
Hindi	7,072	1,335	
Kiunga	3,310	0	Kiunga
Kizingitini	6,010	0	Kizingitini
Mpeketoni	25,530	773	Mpeketoni
Witu	5,980	1,322	Witu
Total	72,686	16,269	-
* 1999 census. Sources

==== Political units ====
There are two constituencies and ten county assembly wards.

Constituency	County wards	Land Area (km^{2})
LAMU WEST	Shella	54.7
LAMU WEST	Mkomani	172.5
LAMU WEST	Hindi	1150.8
LAMU WEST	Mkunumbi	1366.1
LAMU WEST	Hongwe	128.5
LAMU WEST	Bahari	123.3
LAMU WEST	Witu	975.4
LAMU EAST	Faza	79.2
LAMU EAST	Basuba	1708.7
LAMU EAST	Kiunga	513.9
	TOTAL	6273.1
Source: Lamu County CIDP 2013-2017

===== Constituencies =====
- MP – Muthama, Stanley Muiruri Lamu West Constituency
- MP – Ruweida Mohammed Obo Lamu East Constituency

=== Political leadership ===
The first elected governor for the county was Issa Timamy, deputized by Eric Kinyua Mugo. The second elected governor was Fahim Yasin Twaha, deputized by Aboud Bwana Abdulhakim. The first elected senator for the county was Abu Chiaba while the second elected senator was Anuar Loitiptip. The current senator is Joseph Githuka. The first county woman representative was Abdalla Shakilla Mohamed, who was elected in 2013. She was followed by Ruweida Mohamed Obo in 2017. The current county woman representative is Monica Mūthoni Marubu.

For Lamu County, the County Executive Committee comprises:

County Executive Committee
	Number
The Governor	1
The Deputy Governor	1
The County Secretary	1
The CEC Members	10
Total	13

== Education ==
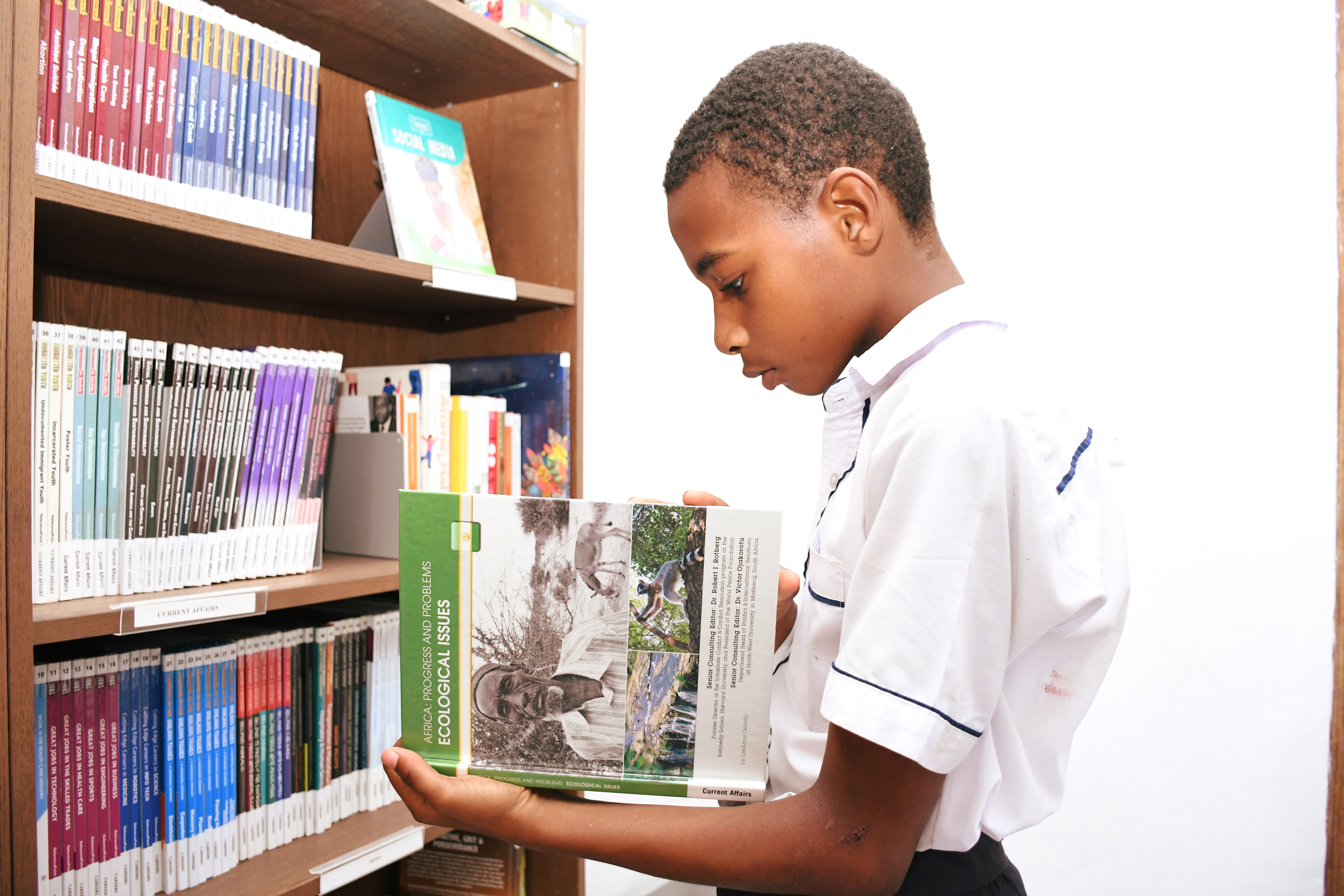
Male student in a library at Shela Primary - Lamu county

Lamu has 203 ECD centres, 139 primary schools and 25 secondary schools. There are also 58 adult training institutions, 6 vocational training centres as well as 3 universities.

== Health ==
There are a total of 45 health facilities in the county, as well as one county referral hospital.

The county has 316 health personnel of different cadres.

HIV prevalence is at 3.5%, compared to the national 5.9%.

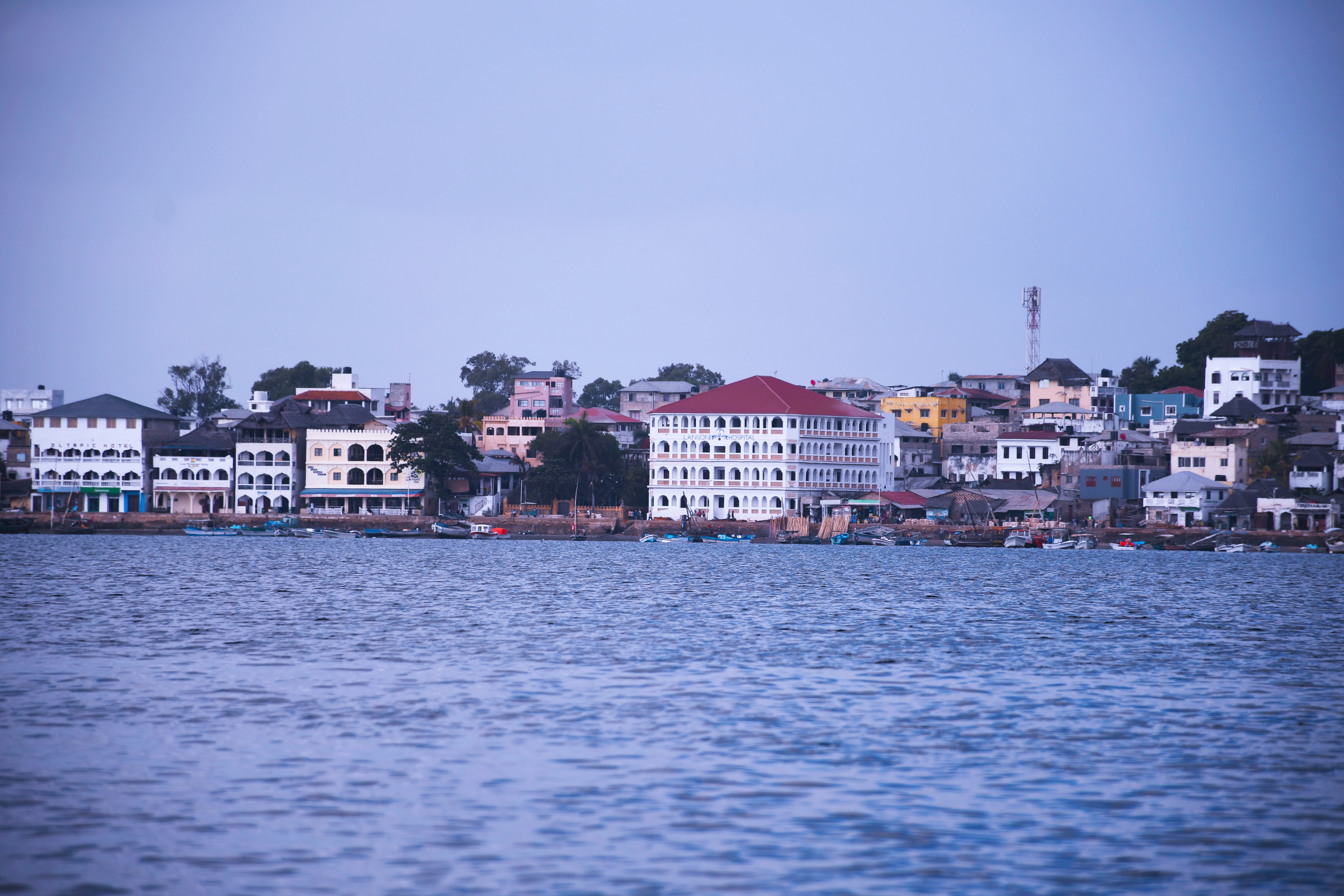
Langoni Hospital in Lamu

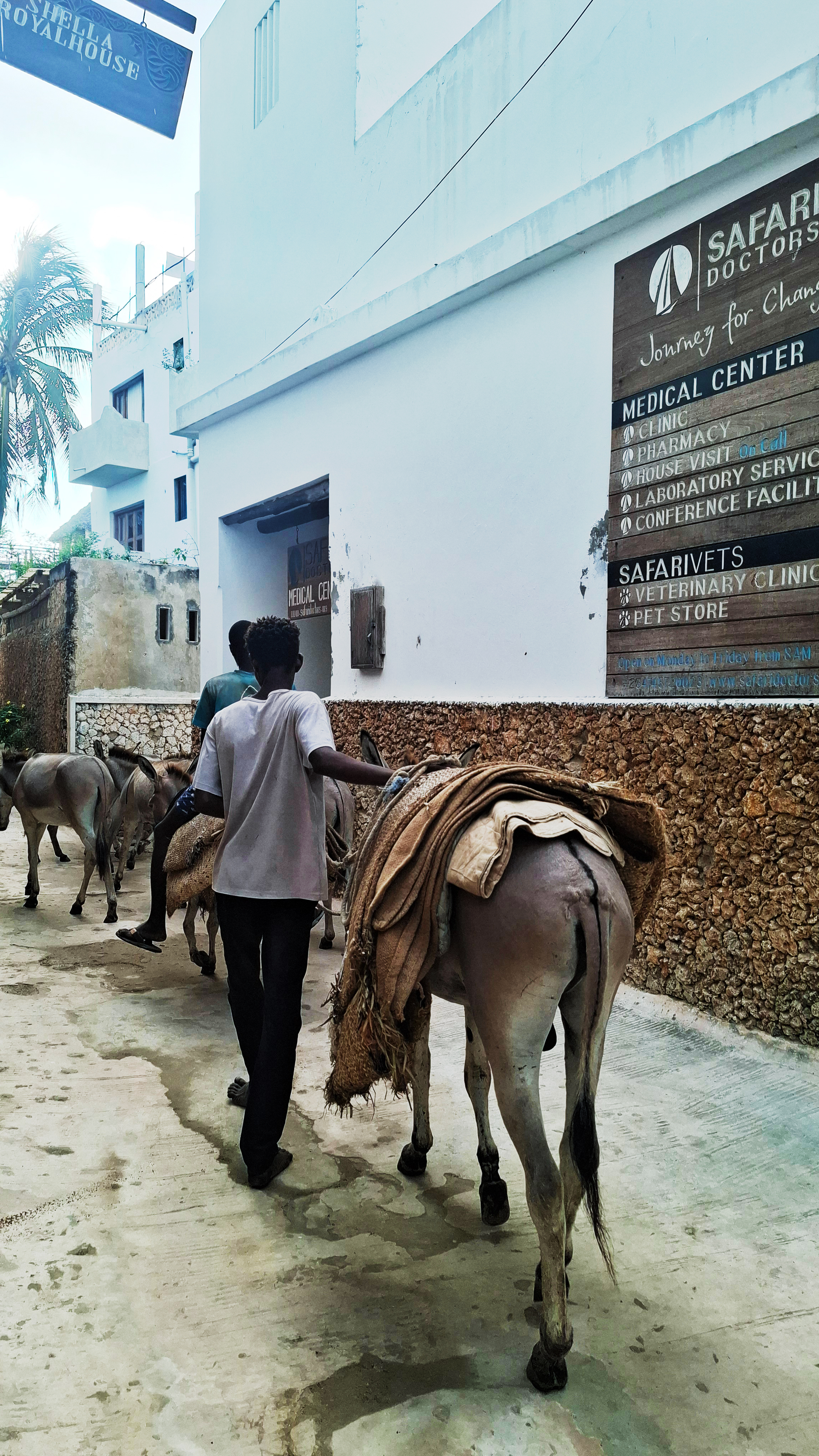
Lamu locals

== Transport and communication ==
The county is covered by 923.07 km of road network. Of this, 718.66 km is covered by earth surface, 198.41 km is murram surface and 6 km is covered by bitumen.

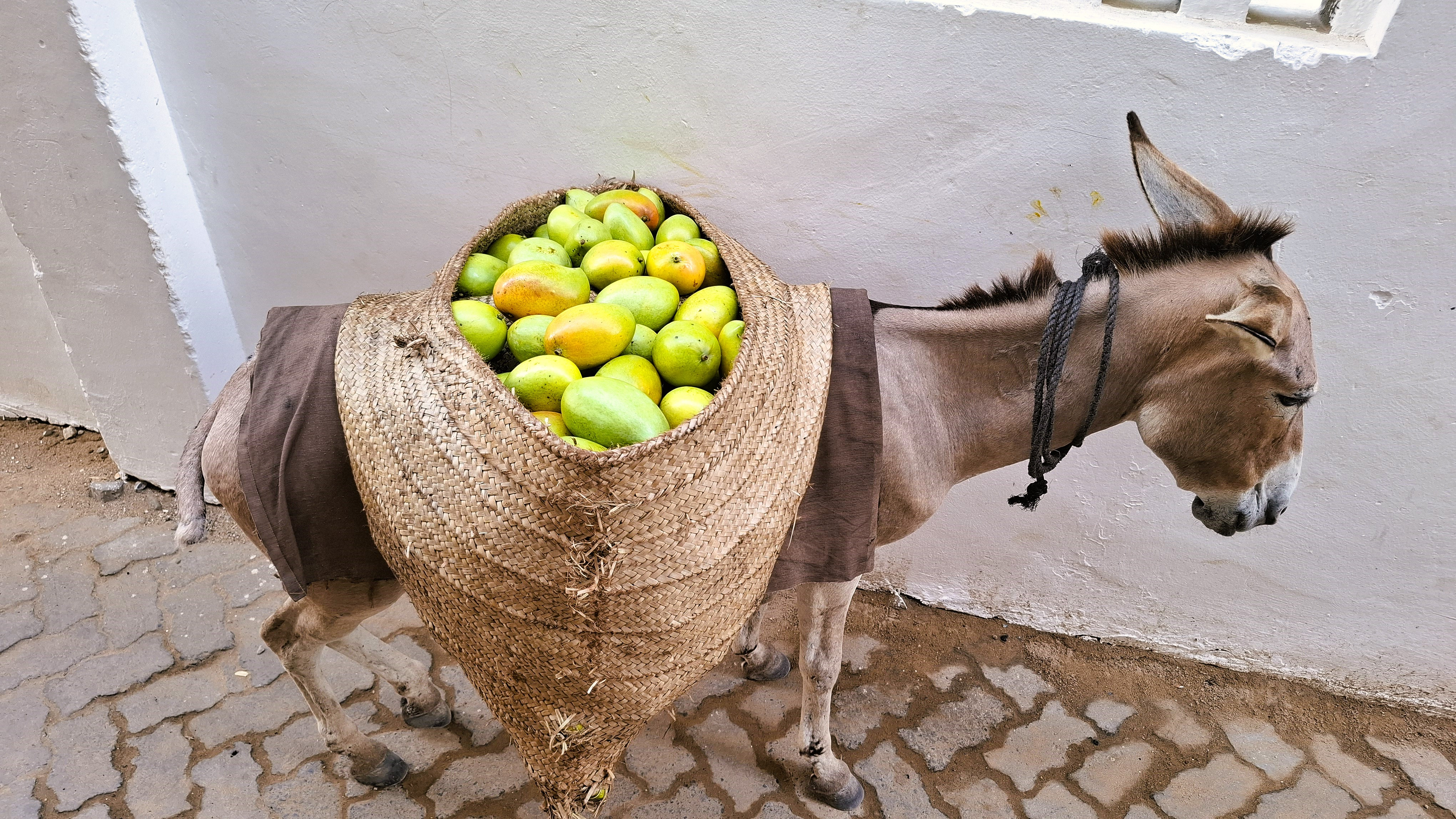
Donkey carrying a sack of mangoes in Shela-Lamu County

The main point of entry to Lamu is through air via Manda Airport (LAU) which gives you access to the islands via boats/dhows. It's also possible to use buses. In Lamu, most locals prefer to walk barefoot (grounding) and they rely heavily on donkeys as a means of transportation (for both people and goods).

There are five post offices with 1,250 installed letter boxes, 653 rented letter boxes and 597 vacant letter boxes.

== Trade and commerce ==
The main economic activities in the county include crop production, livestock production, fisheries, tourism and mining, most notably quarrying. Lamu is rich in minerals like titanium, salt, limestone, coral stones, and sand. Lamu town is termed "the oldest and best-preserved Swahili settlement in East Africa” but neighbouring islands also have numerous archaeological remnants of history dating as far back as the 14th century.

Among the challenges facing Lamu are population growth owing to migration into Lamu from other parts of the country, fuelled partly by the anticipated opportunities accruing from the Lamu Port South Sudan-Ethiopia Transport (LAPSSET) Corridor. Other challenges include landlessness and poor land management, insufficient social services such as healthcare and education, inadequate supply of piped and fresh water, under-developed infrastructure, and food insecurity.

There are 9 trading centres, 606 registered businesses, 465 licensed retail traders, 7 supermarkets, 27 licensed wholesale traders, and 98 registered hotels.

The county has two national reserves: Dodori, and Kiunga Marine, covering 877 km^{2.} Dodori is a breeding ground for the East Lamu Topi, and consists of a variety of mammals and birdlife including lions, elephant shrew, hippo, pelicans, and many more. It has the most varied species of mangrove forest in Kenya at Dodori Creek. Kiunga Marine Reserve consists of several islands rich with biodiversity including valuable coral reefs, sea grass, extensive mangrove forests, and the endangered sea turtles and dugongs. Kiwayu Island, which is part of the reserve, is deemed as having the most pristine beach in Kenya.

== Villages and settlements ==
- Ankish
- Arosen
- Ashuwei
- Bajumwali
- Barigoni
- Bodhei
- Bora Imani
- Chalaluma
- Chundwa
- Dodori
- Duldul
- Hidio
- Junja
- Milimani East
- Milimani West
- Oseni
- Pandanguo
- Rubu
- Shakani

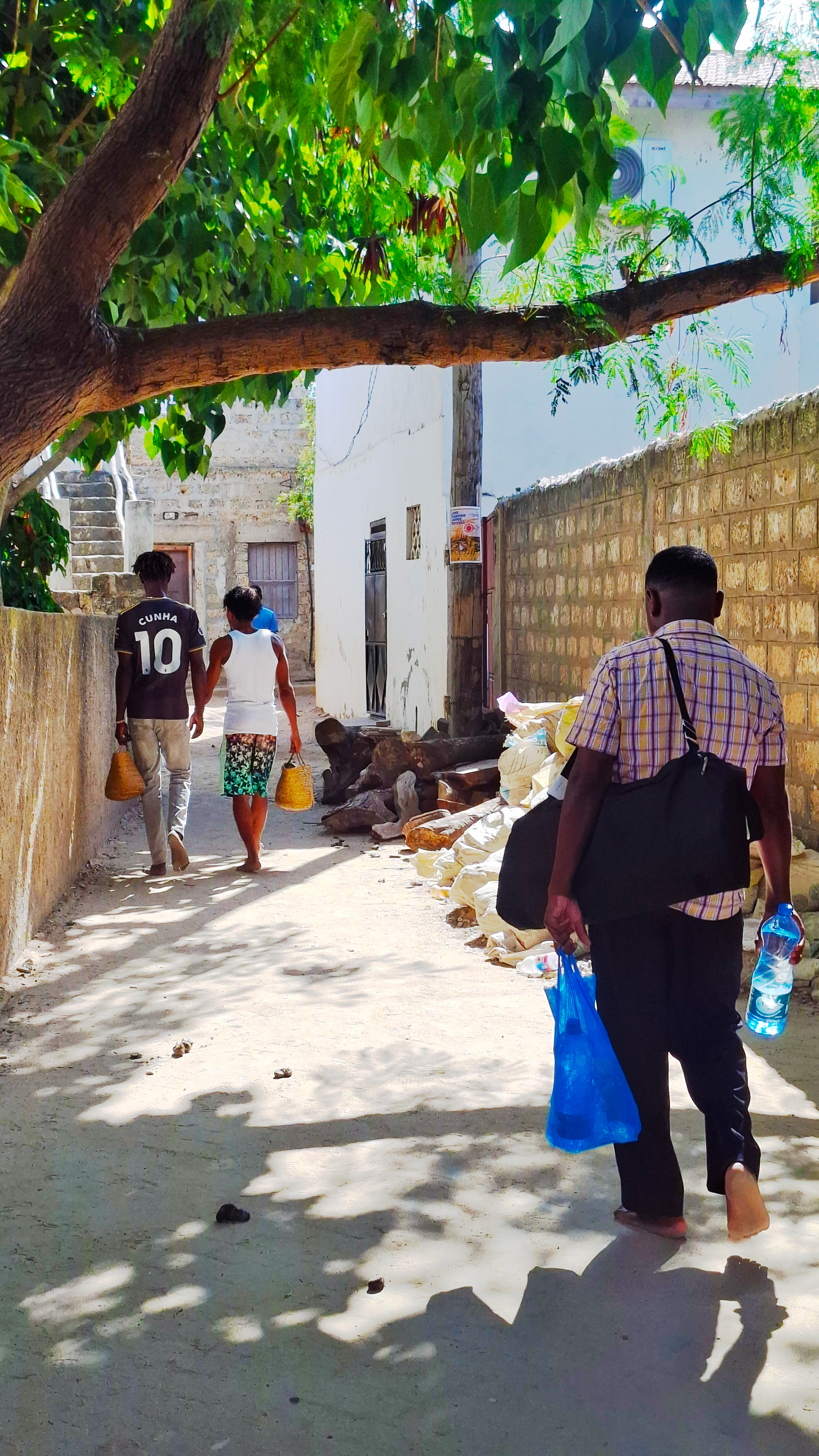
Lamu residents

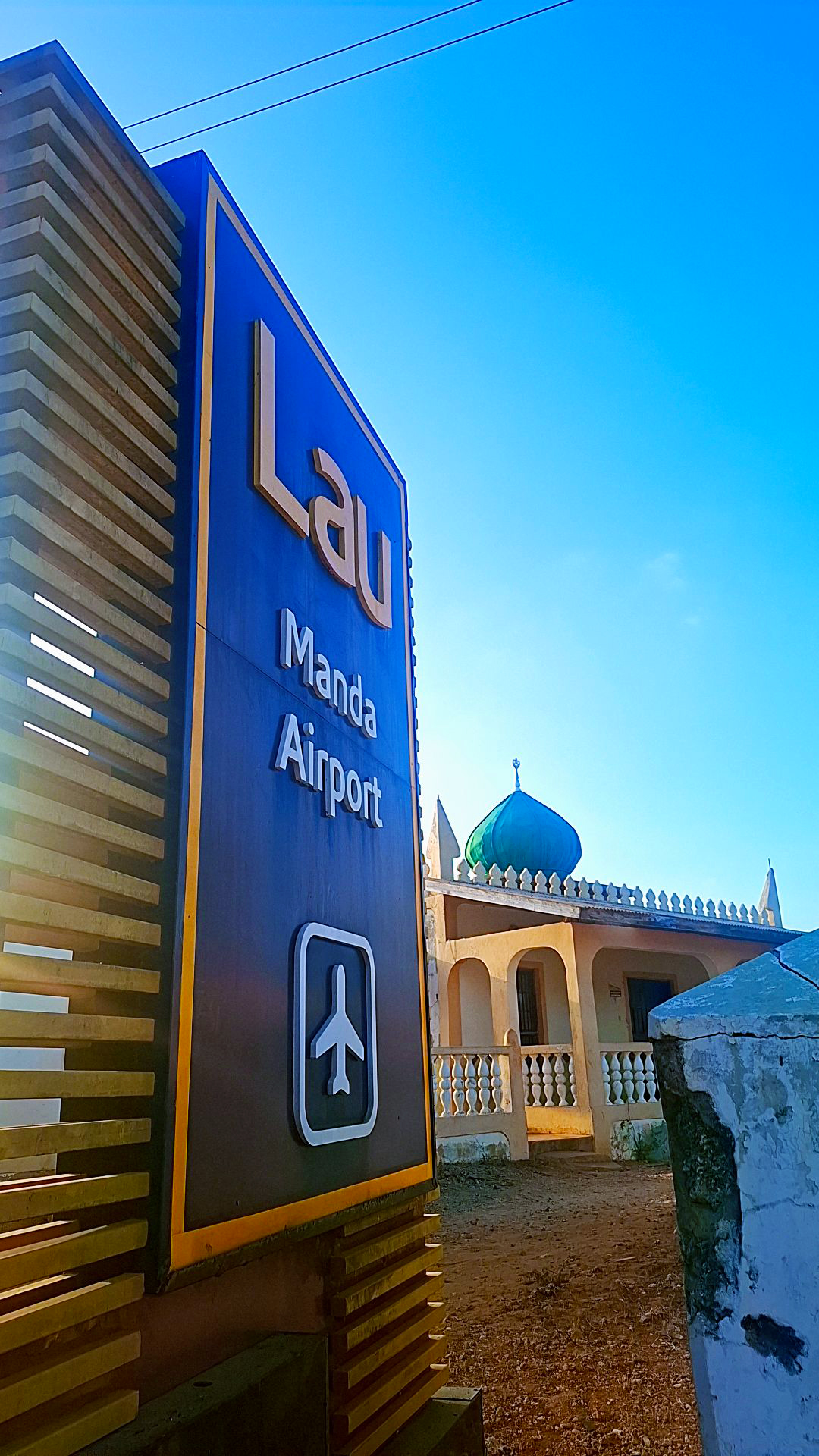
Lau Manda Airport signage

== See also ==
- Tana River County
- Garissa County
- Mombasa County
- Kilifi County
