= Ankish =

Settlement in Lamu County, Kenya

- Location within Kenya
- Coordinates: 1.96°S 40.87°E
- Country: Kenya
- County: Lamu County
- Time zone: UTC+3 (EAT)

Ankish is a settlement in Kenya's Lamu County.

== Climate ==
The climate is tropical humid.

== Separatism ==
Since 2012, an organization calling itself the Mombasa Republican Council has been active to secede the province from the rest of Kenya.
