= Shakani =

- Location within Kenya
- Coordinates: 1.66°S 41.56°E
- Country: Kenya
- Province: North Eastern Province
- Time zone: UTC+3 (EAT)

Shakani is a small coastal village in Lamu County, Kenya. It is situated 3 kilometres (1.9 mi) from the Garissa County boundary and 5.5 kilometres (3.4 mi) away from the border of Somalia. Shakani is a Somali settlement.

== History ==
During the Shifta War after Kenyan independence in the 1960s, residents in 12 local villages including in Shakani, were forced to leave by the security forces. Many were displaced to slums.
