= Abu Chiaba =

Kenyan politician (born 1947)

Abu Chiaba Honourable

Member of the Kenyan Senate
- In office 28 March 2013 – August 2017
- Succeeded by: Anuar Loitiptip
- Constituency: Lamu County

Member of the Kenyan Parliament
- In office 2003–2013
- Constituency: Lamu East

Personal details
- Born: 1947 (age 78–79)
- Party: TNA
- Education: University of Milan

Abu Mohamed Abu Chiaba (born 1947) is a Kenyan politician who has been a member of the Senate of Kenya since 2013 to 2017.

Born in Barawa, Somalia, he was first elected to the National Assembly of Kenya at the 1992 elections by winning the Lamu East Constituency seat on a KANU ticket. He reclaimed the seat at the 2002 elections, still representing KANU. In the 2007 parliamentary election he retained the seat, but now on a Party of National Unity ticket.
