= Pandanguo =

- Country: Kenya
- County: Lamu County
- Time zone: UTC+3 (EAT)

Pandanguo is a settlement in Kenya's Lamu County.

== History ==
On July 5, 2017, al-Shabaab militants attacked a police station in Pandanguo, killing three officers.
