= Deep Sky (company) =

Canadian company developing carbon dioxide sequestration technology

- Industry: Carbon capture and storage
- Founded: 2022
- Headquarters: Montreal, Canada
- Website: www.deepskyclimate.com

Deep Sky is a Canadian project development company specializing in carbon removal facilities. The company uses direct air capture (DAC) and direct ocean capture (DOC) technologies to remove carbon from air and water.

The company deploys multiple existing carbon sequestration technologies at a large scale. It is currently developing a number of carbon capture campuses, each of which is projected to capture and sequester 200,000–300,000 tons of carbon per year.

== History ==
Deep Sky was founded in 2022 by Fred Lalonde, and Joost Ouwerkerk, co-founders of the app-based travel company Hopper, and Laurence Tosi, the former CFO of Airbnb.

In 2023, the company initially raised $10 million in funding from the Quebec government, Brightspark Ventures, and private investors. The company raised an additional $65 million in funding from Whitecap Venture Partners, Investissement Quebec, BDC Capital, and Ontario Municipal Employees Retirement System for a total of $75 million.

In 2024, the company announced a number of partnerships to research and develop pilot projects in order to assess the commercial viability of various DAC technologies.

As of 2024, Deep Sky has partnerships with carbon removal companies and startups, including Carbon Atlantis, Equatic, Skyrenu, Mission Zero, Neg8, Greenlyte, Carbfix, Avnos, Climeworks, Skytree, Captura, Sustaera and Svante.

In December 2024, a US$40 million grant was awarded by Bill Gates' climate solutions venture, with Deep Sky stating that its Alberta test site will begin removing carbon directly from the atmosphere in the spring.

== Technologies ==
Deep Sky is testing a number of carbon removal technologies to assess their viability for large scale carbon removal plants at Deep Sky Labs in Alberta.

=== Carbon capture using seawater ===
In partnership with Equatic, a California-based company, Deep Sky is building a pilot project which uses electrolysis technology developed at UCLA. This method of DAC locks atmospheric carbon into seawater as dissolved bicarbonate ions and as mineral carbonates and produces green hydrogen for use as fuel.

=== Electrochemical carbon dioxide removal ===
In partnership with California-based Captura, Deep Sky is testing electrochemical ocean carbon dioxide removal. The process removes carbon from ocean water by separating the water into acidic and alkaline solutions and then using different processes to remove carbon from each of the solutions.

Deep Sky has established partnerships with UK-based company Mission Zero and Germany-based Greenlyte to test similar DAC technologies.

=== Carbon storage using mineralization ===
In Thetford Mines and Bécancour Canada, Deep Sky is developing a process known as in-situ mineralisation, in which CO_{2} is injected into underground rocks that react with carbon dioxide, converting it into solid stone. When CO_{2}, dissolved in water, is injected into subsurface mafic and ultramafic rock formations, it is permanently stored as calcite rock. This method produces no harmful byproducts and ensures that the CO_{2} does not return to the atmosphere.

== Business model ==
Deep Sky operates a business model centred on the sale of carbon credits. The company provides carbon credits to compliance markets, voluntary markets, and government procurement programs. These credits are purchased by major corporations, including Fortune 500 companies, to offset carbon emissions.

According to Carbon Herald, Deep Sky aims to enhance the efficiency of current carbon removal technologies. The company focuses on the research and development of various technologies, integrating them into a unified process, with an emphasis on direct air capture (DAC) and direct ocean capture (DOC). It also seeks to utilise Canada's geological features and renewable energy resources in its efforts.

== See also ==
- Carbon capture and storage
