= GoodLeap =

Financial technology company

- Formerly: Paramount Equity (2003–2017); Loanpal (2017–2021)
- Type: Private
- Industry: Finance and Mortgage
- Founded: 2003; 23 years ago
- Founders: Hayes Barnard; Jason Walker; Matt Dawson
- Headquarters: San Francisco, California, U.S.
- Key people: Hayes Barnard (Chairman and CEO); John Shrewsberry (CFO); Daniel Lotano (CSO)
- Services: Residential solar and battery storage loans; FHA insured loan; Conventional loans; Refinance and home purchase loans; VA loans; Fintech
- Revenue: US$361 million (2020)
- Number of employees: 1,300
- Website: goodleap.com

GoodLeap, formerly Loanpal, is a U.S.-based financing company headquartered in Roseville, CA that provides financing options for residential solar energy and other sustainable home improvements. It has facilitated over $30 billion in loans to more than 1 million homeowners across 50 states as of 2025.

The company employs about 1,300 people. It has locations in Roseville, San Francisco, Irvine, Phoenix, Kansas City, and Bentonville, Arkansas.

== History ==
Paramount Equity Mortgage, founded in 2003 by Hayes Barnard, Jason Walker and Matt Dawson. The company was incorporated in California to provide residential mortgage loans. Although they launched in California's Sacramento Valley, the company lends nationwide.

In 2006, the founders launched an insurance company focused on auto and home insurance. After over ten years offering insurance services, the company sold its insurance company to Brown and Brown.

In 2009, the company established Paramount Solar as a subsidiary to focus on solar energy financing, responding to growing demand for renewable energy solutions. In 2013, Paramount Solar was sold to SolarCity (now Tesla Energy) in a transaction valued at approximately $120 million. In 2011, the company took on an equity investment from Guthy-Renker.

In December 2017, Paramount began originating residential solar loans and later rebranded as Loanpal.

In 2019, Loanpal announced a partnership with PenFed Credit Union. In 2019, Loanpal was responsible for 30% of all new residential loans in the U.S.

In 2020, they launched their online platform.

In June 2020, Goldman Sachs securitized $459 million worth of Loanpal loans they had previously purchased and expanded their warehouse facility to $300 million with Loanpal. Goldman Sachs also committed to buying $320 million in loans from Loanpal. By October 2020, the company had funded over $4.5 billion in solar loans and closed a securitization of $434 million worth of Loanpal loans in November 2020 and was responsible for 41% of the solar loan market in the U.S. and was the top solar lender in the country.

In January 2021, Loanpal raised $800 million in a funding round led by New Enterprise Associates, West Cap Group, Brookfield Asset Management, and Riverstone Holdings. The company received an additional $800 million in funding from MSD Partners, BDT Capital Partners and Davidson Kempner in October 2021. Between January and October 2021 the company had raised a total of over $1 billion in funding.

In June 2021, Loanpal rebranded to GoodLeap. The rebranding to GoodLeap reflected a broader mission to finance sustainable home solutions beyond solar, including energy-efficient windows, HVAC, and battery storage, aligning with environmental and affordability goals.

In August 2024, GoodLeap launched GoodGrid, a virtual power plant initiative in California, aggregating customer batteries to enhance grid reliability.

== Leadership ==
Hayes Barnard is currently the Chairman and CEO.

In December 2022, GoodLeap formed an advisory council made up of celebrities and business veterans, including Tony Gonzalez, Edward Norton, Shailene Woodley, and Jeff Immelt.

As of December 2023 John Shrewsberry, former CFO of Wells Fargo, is chief financial officer. And Daniel Lotano, former president of EverBright, as chief strategy officer.

== Controversies ==
On July 23, 2008, Washington mortgage regulators announced plans to revoke Paramount Equity Mortgage's license and fine the company $500,000, alleging “deceptive lending practices.” These included charging and collecting unearned fees, charging consumers to buy down interest rates without actually reducing them, failing to make required disclosures, and presenting both state and federally mandated disclosures in a deceptive manner. The company and its three founders were named in the suit. The case ended in a settlement agreement that required the company to pay the state $253,366, provide $139,075 in restitution to 52 customers, change its advertising, address other issues, and allowed it to continue operations.

As of 2024, dozens of litigation and arbitration cases are in process in which GoodLeap customers have alleged they were tricked into taking out onerous loans, were misled about the terms of the loans, or were signed up for a loan without their knowledge.

On March 8, 2024 the Minnesota Attorney General filed suit against GoodLeap and three other lending companies (Sunlight Financial, Solar Mosaic, and Dividend Solar Finance—a subsidiary of Fifth Third Bank). The lawsuit alleges the lenders violated Minnesota state laws against deceptive trade practices, deceptive lending, and illegally high rates of interest.

GoodLeap has terminated over 20 fraudulent liens and loans in Orleans Parish following investigations, and the company states it is committed to addressing customer concerns and improving transparency.

== See also ==
GivePower
