= Lamu West Constituency =

Electoral constituency in Kenya

Lamu West
- constituency for the Parliament of Kenya
- Lamu West Constituency within Lamu County

- Lamu County within Kenya
- County: Lamu County
- Population: 121,662
- Area: 3,945 km^{2} (1,523.2 sq mi)

Current constituency
- Party: JP
- Member of Parliament: Stanley Muiruri Muthama
- Wards: 7

Lamu West Constituency is an electoral constituency in Kenya. It is one of two constituencies in Lamu County. The constituency has eleven wards, all electing MCAs for the Lamu County Assembly.

== Members of Parliament ==
Elections	MP	Party	Notes
1966	Abu Somo	KANU	One-party system
1969	Abu Somo	KANU	One-party system
1970	Mohamed M. Modhihiri	KANU	By-elections, One-party system
1974	Abdulrahman Omar Cheka	KANU	One-party system
1979	Abdulrahman Omar Cheka	KANU	One-party system
1983	Omar Twalib Mzee	KANU	One-party system
1988	Abdul Aziz Bujra	KANU	One-party system
1992	Abdukarim Mohamed Ali	KANU	
1997	Fahim Yasin Twaha	KANU	
2002	Fahim Yasin Twaha	KANU	
2007	Fahim Yasin Twaha	NARC-K	
2013	Julius K Ndegwa	Safina	
2017	Stanley Muiruri Muthama	MCCP	
2022	Stanley Muiruri Muthama	JP	

== Locations and wards ==
Locations	Population
Baharini	6,380
Dide Waride	3,294
Hindi Magongoni	5,303
Hongwe	6,538
Langoni	8,619
Mapenya	5,334
Matondoni	2,797
Mkomani	6,819
Mkunumbi	1,678
Mokowe	3,121
Mpeketoni	9,977
Ndambwe	505
Shella / Manda	2,386
Witu	3,830
Total	66,581
1999 census.

Ward	Registered Voters
Baharini	2,228
Dide Waride	1,380
Hindi/Magogoni	1,921
Hongwe	2,581
Langoni / Manda / Shella	4,649
Mapenya	1,697
Mkomani / Matondoni	4,780
Mkunumbi	1,606
Mokowe	1,466
Mpeketoni	3,926
Witu	2,783
Total	29,017
*September 2005.
