= Anuar Loitiptip =

Kenyan politician

Honourable Anuar Loitiptip Senator

Member of the Kenyan Parliament
- In office August 2017 – August 2022
- Preceded by: Abu Chiaba
- Succeeded by: Joseph Githuku

Anuar Loitiptip was a Kenyan politician who was the senator for Lamu County, from 2017 — 2022.
