= Ali Sharif Athman =

Kenyan politician

Ali Sharif Athman is a Kenyan politician and a member of the 11th parliament of Kenya elected from Lamu East on the ticket of United Democratic Forum Party (UDF) and with support of Amani Coalition in 2013.

== Education and career ==
Ali Athman was born in Lamu and attended Kizingitini Primary School where he earned his Kenya Certificate of Primary Education (KCPE) in 1992 and earned his Kenya Certificate of Secondary Education (KCSE) from Khamis High School in 1996. He obtained a diploma in clearing and forwarding from the Pioneer Commercial College in 1998 and a certificate in management from Kenya Institute of Management in 2012 before attending California Miramar University to study an Associate of Science in Business Administration.

He was elected to the 11th Kenyan national assembly for Lamu East Constituency on the ticket of UDF and Amani Coalition. In the parliament, he was a member of the Departmental Committee on Lands and Natural Resources. In 2015, Wario proposed establishment of an affiliate college of International University of Africa in Lamu to address education needs of the county.

In 2017, he ran again for MP of Lamu East Constituency, but was defeated by Ruweida Mohamed Obo.
