= Milimani West =

Place in Lamu County, Kenya

- Location within Kenya
- Coordinates: 1.78°S 40.82°E
- Country: Kenya
- County: Lamu County
- Time zone: UTC+3 (EAT)

Milimani West is a settlement in Kenya's Lamu County.
