= Milimani East =

- Location within Kenya
- Coordinates: 1.77°S 40.83°E
- Country: Kenya
- County: Lamu County
- Time zone: UTC+3 (EAT)

Milimani East is a settlement in Kenya's Lamu County. It is located in Boni Forest.

Pupils in Milimani are airlifted to school by military helicopter at the start of each term, due to floods.
