= Jonathan D. Gray =

American businessman (born 1970)

Jon Gray
- Born: February 4, 1970 (age 56); Highland Park, Illinois, U.S.
- Education: University of Pennsylvania (BA, BS)
- Occupations: President and COO of The Blackstone Group; Chairman of Hilton Worldwide
- Political party: Democratic
- Spouse: Mindy Basser (m. 1995)
- Children: 4

Jonathan D. Gray (born February 4, 1970) is an American billionaire businessman who is the president and chief operating officer of Blackstone Group, a New York–based asset management firm. He is also the chairman of Hilton Worldwide.

== Early life and education ==
Gray was born in Highland Park, Illinois, to a Jewish family. His father Allen Gray owned a small auto parts manufacturer on the West Side of Chicago (coincidentally named Blackstone Manufacturing); his mother Susan, remarried to his stepfather James Florsheim, ran a catering business. His parents divorced when he was young. In 1992, Gray graduated from the University of Pennsylvania magna cum laude with a B.A. in English from the School of Arts & Sciences and a B.S. from the Wharton School. He was elected to Phi Beta Kappa.

== Career ==
In 1992, Gray joined Blackstone's mergers and acquisitions and private equity group, and joined its newly formed real estate private equity group the following year. He became co-head of the real estate group in 2005 and global head of real estate in 2011, overseeing a portfolio of hotel, office, retail, industrial, and residential properties in the U.S., Europe, and Asia.

Gray led Blackstone's LBO of Hilton Hotels, which became the most profitable private equity real estate deal ever, earning $14 billion for the firm's investors. Gray continues to act as chairman of the Board of Hilton Worldwide, which went public in December 2013.

=== Honors ===
Gray was named in Fortune's "40 under 40," in 2009. In 2016, he ranked #1 on Commercial Observer's "Power 100" ranking of the most powerful people in New York City real estate. In 2016, Gray was named to Vanity Fair's "New Establishment" list.

=== Residential homes ===
In 2013, Gray helped create a business venture through Blackstone called Invitation Homes to buy foreclosed single-family houses and turn them into rentals. The Wall Street Journal reported that Gray went on the “biggest home buying spree in history” after the foreclosure crisis, spending $10 billion in the company's first four years. The firm would later come under criticism for its business model, and US Senator Elizabeth Warren criticized Blackstone for "shamelessly" profiting from the 2008 housing crisis.

=== Blackstone president ===
In February 2018, it was announced that Gray would become president and chief operating officer of Blackstone, replacing Hamilton "Tony" James in overseeing day-to-day operations of the firm.

As president, Gray encouraged a thematic approach across Blackstone's businesses, investing in companies or assets that stand to benefit from larger trends, including: shifts to e-commerce, advancements in life sciences, increased demand for data centers due to artificial intelligence, investments related to the energy transition, and the growth of private credit. Gray also led efforts to expand Blackstone's client base outside the typical pool of large institutional investors it historically served, including insurers and individual investors.

Under Gray, in 2023 Blackstone became the first alternative asset manager to reach $1 trillion in assets under management and join the S&P 500.

== Politics ==
In 2016, it was reported that Gray was under consideration as Treasury Secretary for the incoming presidential administration of Donald Trump. Gray's boss and Trump's friend Stephen A. Schwarzman quickly dismissed the idea that a slot in a Republican cabinet would be offered to a Democratic supporter like Gray. Gray withdrew his name from consideration and Steven Mnuchin was eventually nominated and confirmed.

Gray has been a major Democratic donor, backing Hillary Clinton in 2016 and several Democratic presidential candidates in the 2020 election In 2023, he co-hosted a fundraiser for the Joe Biden 2024 presidential campaign.

=== Hong Kong ===
Gray was scheduled to speak at the November 2022 Global Financial Leaders' Investment Summit, with the Hong Kong Democracy Council claiming that his presence, along with other financial executives, legitimizes the Hong Kong government's whitewashing of the erosion of freedoms in the city. On 22 October 2022, The Wall Street Journal released an article by its editorial board in its printed edition, titled "Wall Street and Hong Kong's Strongman," mentioning Gray's name, and saying that "These executives may feel they have assets to protect in the city, but by kowtowing to Mr. Lee they are doing their reputations, and that of their companies, no good." Gray later contracted COVID-19 and sent CFO Michael Chae to the event instead.

== Views ==
=== AI bubble ===
In October 2026, Gray publicly rebutted the notion of a looming "AI bubble", in response to earlier claims made by hedge-fund manager and Citadel LLC CEO Ken Griffin that AI-related sectors would be “almost certainly” heading into this direction. Speaking to Bloomberg Television, he said “when you think about a bubble, you think about building capacity and then hoping demand comes”, while “with AI, you're building capacity, and you're hoping you can keep up with the demand”, implying that demand for AI computing power is already or about to exceed supply. According to TechCrunch's Temkin, Blackstone had by then already positioned itself “at the center of the AI boom”, meaning as a major private financier of AI infrastructure.

== Philanthropy ==
The Gray Foundation was launched in 2014, focusing on inherited BRCA mutations and increasing access to education and healthcare for low-income youth in New York City.

As of 2025, Gray had donated $245 million in his lifetime. In 2018, he gave $23 million, ranking #49 on Forbes' America's Top 50 Givers. On May 7, 2025, it was announced that Gray plans on donating $125 million to Tel Aviv University's Faculty of Medicine, to be named the Jon and Mindy Gray Faculty of Medicine.

In February 2023, the Grays were named to The Chronicle of Philanthropy's list of the 50 biggest donors in 2022.

=== Cancer research ===
The Grays have donated over $150 million to BRCA cancer research. In May 2012, Gray and his wife, Mindy Gray, founded the Basser Research Center, named in honor of Mindy's sister, Faith Basser, who died of ovarian cancer at age 44. The Grays donated $25 million to create the Basser Research Center, which focuses on cancer prevention, treatment, and research of BRCA-related, genetically inherited cancers. This donation also established the Basser Global Prize, honoring cutting-edge cancer research. In January 2014, the Basser Research Center announced an additional $5 million gift from the couple to fund an external research grant program. Town & Country (magazine) noted this work in its "Top Philanthropists of 2016" feature, in which the Grays were included.

In May 2017, the Grays announced they would be donating $21 million to the Basser Center for BRCA at the University of Pennsylvania, bringing their total pledges to the initiative to $55 million. In July 2019, it was announced that the Grays would donate a further $25 million for research on pernicious genetic mutations that can lead to breast and ovarian cancer.

In October 2022, the Grays announced a gift of $55 million to establish the Basser Cancer Interception Institute as part of the Basser Center for BRCA. The new institute will look for innovative ways to detect and treat BRCA-related cancers before surgery, radiation or chemotherapy become the necessary treatment. This donation brings their total giving to the University of Pennsylvania to over $125 million.

=== Other philanthropy ===
In November 2016, The New York Times reported on a $10 million donation from the Grays to finance a pilot program that creates college savings accounts for thousands of New York City public school kindergartners. Gray serves on the board of The Trinity School, as well as on the board of Harlem Village Academies, a group of charter schools in New York City. Gray recently donated $10 million to purchase a building in northern Manhattan which will serve as the organization's second elementary school. In 2019, the Gray's announced a $10 million gift to support first-generation, low-income students attending the University of Pennsylvania. In 2021 the Gray Foundation contributed $15 million to a program that opens a college savings account with $100 for every child enrolled in New York City public kindergartens. In May 2025, it was announced that the Gray Foundation will donate $125 million to the Faculty of Medical and Health Sciences at the Tel Aviv University, which will be renamed the Gray Faculty of Medical and Health Sciences.

== Personal life ==
In 1995, Gray married Mindy Basser at Temple Beth Zion Israel in Philadelphia; the ceremony was officiated by Rabbi Ira F. Stone. He lives in Manhattan with his wife and their four daughters. In August 2013, Bloomberg estimated his net worth at just over $1.0 billion due to his owning 40.6 million Blackstone shares valued at $913 million combined with over $120 million in bonuses and salary.
