= Ashuwei =

Settlement in Lamu County, Kenya

- Location within Kenya
- Coordinates: 1.93°S 41.32°E
- Country: Kenya
- County: Lamu County
- Time zone: UTC+3 (EAT)

Ashuwei is a Bajuni sea settlement in Kenya's Lamu County.

The total population of the region was estimated to range between 8,000 and 10,000 people.

To the east of Ashuwei is the Indian Ocean which stretches approximately a hundred kilometers to the south border of Somalia. To the east and north is Ashuwei mainland which is mostly forest cover.

Bajuni People inhabited the region & used to hunt dikdik, buffalo, and other animals. The residents however engaged mostly in fishing and farming as their main economic activities and source of livelihoods. Farming was mostly done during raining days and fishing during summer seasons.

The village is believed to have never lacked water as a result of frequent rains plus the existence of several wells. The land is fertile & supports the growth of maize, sim sim, wheat etc.

However, due to its close proximity to Somalia border, it was constantly attacked by militant raiders of Somali origin popularly came to be known as the Shifta. This forced the residents to flee to the neighbouring villages such as Ndau, Faza, Mbwajumwali and Mtangawanda. Others fled to Malindi and Mombasa towns.

All this happened at a time when Kenya had just gained her independence from the British rule & could not protect its citizens who lived close to the borders. This made the Bajuni People to be the first Internally Displaced People in the country.

Later on when the country had gained stability & exercised its sovereignty, the families who fled from Ashuwei incepted a thought of going back to their ancestral land. In 1998, the respected elders decided to make several trips to Ashuwei with the aim of reclaiming their land which had now been grabbed by powerful politicians in Government who took advantage of the insecurity crisis.

The council of elders agenda agreed to make Ashuwei a community land so that those who originated from there could benefit from the land of their forefathers.

Despite the many obstacles encountered, the title deeds which were illegally acquired by the politicians were revoked. However, the efforts to make Ashuwei a community land have yet to bear fruit, though the struggle still continues.
