= GivePower =

Non-profit organization that develops clean water and energy systems

- Predecessor: SolarCity (non-profit branch)
- Founded: 2013
- Key people: Hayes Barnard (president)
- Website: givepower.org

GivePower is a 501(c)(3) non-profit organization that develops clean water and energy systems in communities across the world. GivePower has installed 2,650 solar power installations in villages across 17 countries and in underdeveloped areas of the United States.

== History ==
GivePower was co-founded in 2013 in California by Hayes Barnard and Lyndon Rive as the non-profit branch of SolarCity. After SolarCity merged with Tesla in 2016, GivePower was spun off into an independent organization just before the merger was completed. The president of GivePower is Hayes Barnard.

In 2014, the organization's first focus was to provide one school with solar-powered lighting for every megawatt of solar system installed by SolarCity that year.

In 2021, GivePower was listed as a finalist in Fast Company's 2021 World Changing Ideas Awards.

== Projects ==
In 2016, GivePower began developing solar powered desalination technology that could be exported to developing regions. The desalination systems are contained within 20-foot shipping containers and can desalinate up to 75,000 gallons of seawater and/or brackish water into potable water per day.

In 2018, GivePower installed its first desalination plant in Kiunga, Kenya, which is also solar powered. The project cost $500,000 and took one month to construct. As of 2019, the Kiunga plant could produce enough drinking water for up to 50,000 people per day and requires minimal maintenance.

As of 2018, GivePower had installed 2650 solar power installations in villages through seventeen countries for institutions like primary schools and medical clinics. They have also developed solar installations in underdeveloped areas of the United States, including the Standing Rock Sioux Reservation. Once installations are completed, GivePower transfers the maintenance and running of them to local communities.

In 2019, GivePower built a 300 kilowatt solar farm on the Standing Rock Sioux Reservation which became the largest solar installation in North Dakota. The project was a partnership between Empowered by Light and GivePower, and the total cost was $470,000. The maintenance of the solar farm also created jobs for the Sioux Nation Tribe. The same year, the organization partnered with World Hope International to build a solar-powered desalination center in Haiti. The water plant was fully operational and self-sufficient by 2020.
