= Issa Timamy =

Governor of Lamu County

Issa Abdallah Issa Timamy
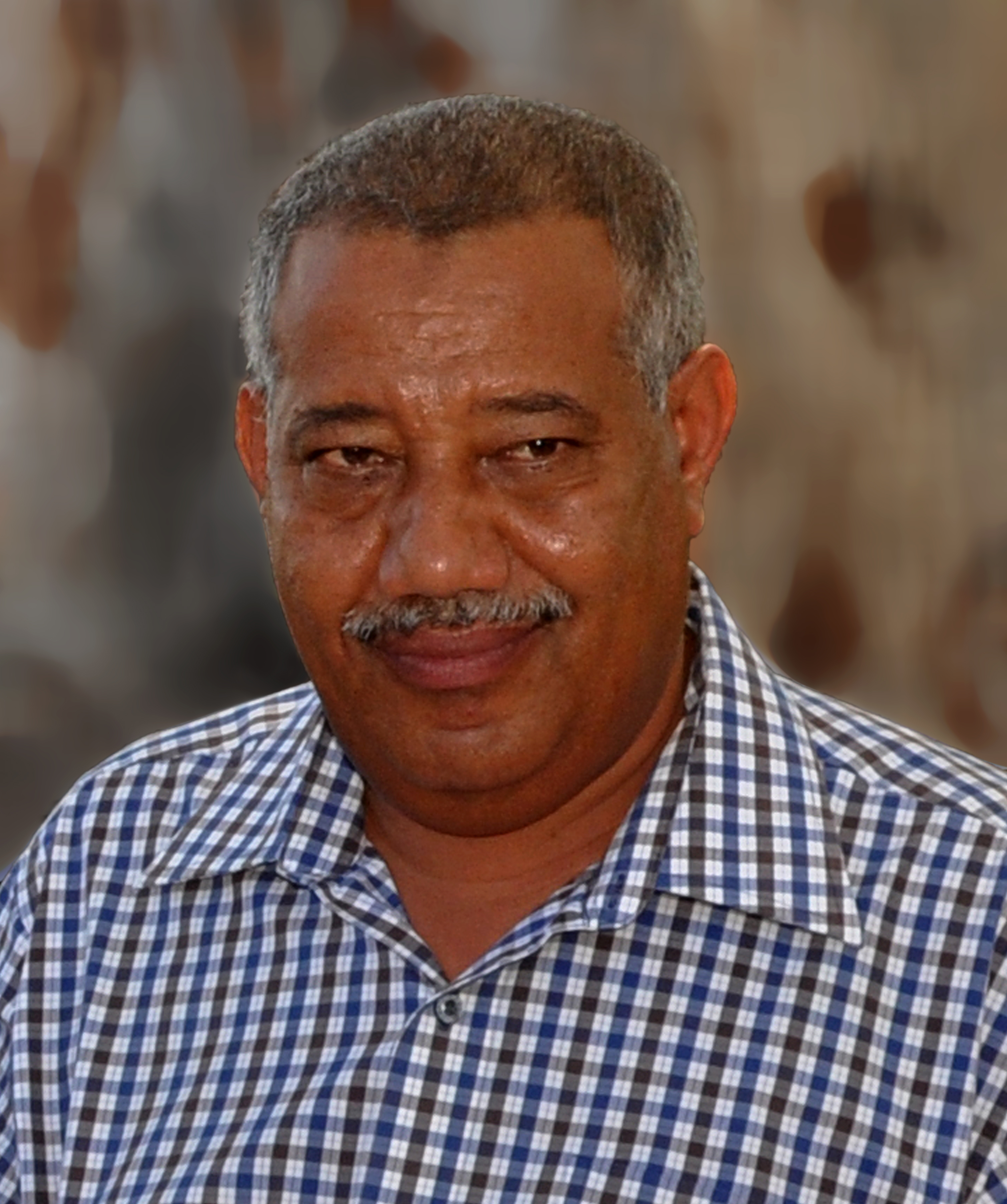

Governor of Lamu County
- In office 2013–2017
- Deputy: Raphael Munyua
- Preceded by: None
- Succeeded by: H.E. Fahim Twaha
- Incumbent
- Assumed office 2022

Personal details
- Born: 12 September 1958 (age 68) Mkomani, Lamu
- Party: Amani National Congress (ANC)
- Education: University of Nairobi.
- Website: www.issatimamy.com

Issa Abdallah Issa Timamy (born 12 September 1958) is a Kenyan politician. He was the Governor of Lamu County until he lost the seat in the 2017 general election.But later regained his seat as the governor of Lamu on the previous elections held on August 9, 2022. A lawyer by training, prior to his election, he served as the chairman of the National Museums of Kenya. He was elected as candidate for the United Democratic Forum (UDF).

Trained at the University of Nairobi as a lawyer, Timamy was born in 1959 in Lamu, where he also grew up. He went to Lamu and Sacred Heart primary schools before joining Allidina Visram High School in Mombasa. Timamy worked for many years as company secretary and director at Sameer Group of Companies in Nairobi. In 2005, he was appointed chairman of the board of directors of the National Museums of Kenya, from where he resigned in 2012 to venture into politics.

He still runs his law firm Timamy and Company Advocates in Mombasa and specializes in commercial law. A father of five, Timamy is married to Dr Hajara El-Busaidy, daughter of prominent scholar Prof Abdulgafur El-Busaidy.

In Kenya’s 2013 general election, Timamy vied in the gubernatorial elections, winning as Governor of Lamu County, alongside Deputy Governor Erick Kinyua Mugo. He was elected on a UDF party ticket.

Former Governor Issa Timamy unveiled a Hindi Orphanage Center built at cost of Sh17 million. The Governor thanked Al Furqan Charitable Society in Turkey for the Center. The Center will admit more than 200 orphans and other children from destitute families within the county.

Al-Kheir foundation, an invited friend and partner of the Governor, is a humanitarian organization based in the UK. The foundation is building two-bedroom houses for villagers in Bahamisi village, Pate Island in Lamu County. Al-Khair Foundation Africa will start the Sh30 million project in Bahamisi village and extend it to more villages. The residents live in poor conditions with no water, health services, education or food. They have no beds and their houses are leaking. The Founder and president of the foundation, Imam Qasim Ahmad, said they will build 28 modern houses and furnish them. Ahmad said they will also set up a mosque, a health centre, and an early childhood education centre. The project was launched in the presence of the Governor.

The former Governor has also branded Lamu as an Island of festivals, as a move to revive the tourism industry and since then, there has been an increase of visitors through airport arrivals.

Research that was done by the Department of Humanity, University of Nairobi on accountability and transparency in devolved units, ranked the Governor among the Top FIVE Governors in the Country that are likely to be re-elected because of his development record. This of course proved to be right as he regained his seat on the previous concluded elections held on August 9, 2022.
