= Michael Chae =

American business executive

Michael S. Chae
- Education: Harvard College (AB); University of Cambridge (MPhil); Yale Law School (JD)
- Occupation: Business executive
- Employer: Blackstone Inc.
- Title: Vice Chairman and Chief Financial Officer
- Spouse: Alexa Bator Chae

Michael S. Chae (born 1968) is an American business executive who serves as vice chairman and chief financial officer of Blackstone Inc. He joined Blackstone in 1997 and has held leadership roles across the firm’s private equity business in the United States and Asia. He was appointed CFO in 2015 and was named vice chairman in 2025.

== Early life and education ==
Chae earned an AB from Harvard College in 1990 and an MPhil in International Relations from Cambridge University. He received a JD from Yale Law School in 1997.

Before law school, he worked at Dillon, Read & Co. and The Carlyle Group.

== Career ==
Chae joined Blackstone in 1997 and became a senior partner in the U.S. private‑equity business. He later led Blackstone’s media, telecommunications, and international private equity activities. Beginning in 2010, Chae served as head of private equity for Asia Pacific while based in Hong Kong, returning to New York in 2014.

In July 2015, Blackstone named Chae chief financial officer, succeeding Laurence Tosi. In January 2025, Blackstone identified Chae publicly as vice chairman in addition to his CFO role. As CFO, Chae sits on Blackstone’s Management Committee and firmwide investment committees, and he chairs the valuation and enterprise risk committees.

== Boards and nonprofit work ==
In 2024, Harvard announced Chae’s election to the board of the Harvard Management Company. In 2026, Chae became a member of the Harvard Corporation, Harvard's governing board. He is a trustee of the Asia Society and a director of the Robin Hood Foundation, and he has served as a trustee of St. Bernard’s School in New York City. Chae is a former board president and now trustee emeritus of The Lawrenceville School.

At Yale Law School, he and Alexa Bator Chae founded the Michael S. and Alexa B. Chae Initiative in Private Sector Leadership, part of the Tsai Leadership Program, to support students pursuing private‑sector careers. Chae is a member of the Council on Foreign Relations.

== Personal life ==
Chae is married to attorney Alexa Bator Chae. In March 2025, Bloomberg reported that Chae entered the Bloomberg Billionaires Index based on his Blackstone equity holdings.

As of April 2025, Forbes estimated his net worth at $1.1 billion.
