= Monicah Muthoni Marubu =

Kenyan politician

Hon. Monicah Muthoni Marubu

County Woman Representative for Lamu County
- Constituency: Lamu County

Personal details
- Born: Ndeu, Hindi, Lamu County, Kenya
- Party: Orange Democratic Movement (ODM)
- Education: Lamu Girls High School
- Alma mater: United States International University-Africa
- Occupation: Politician
- Profession: Public servant
- Known for: Advocacy for women, youth empowerment, and community development

Monicah Muthoni Marubu is a Kenyan politician and the current County Women Representative for Lamu county.

== Background and education ==
Marubu was born in Ndeu, Hindi. She attended Ndeu Primary School. From there she joined Lamu Girls High School from 2004 to 2007 and graduating with a Kenya Certificate of Secondary Education. She later joined United States International University-Africa in 2009 and graduated with a Bachelor's degree in International Relations.

== Career ==
Marubu won the elections in August 2022 becoming a member of the 13th Parliament. She belongs to the Orange Democratic Movement. Before joining active politics she was known for community engagements that aimed at improving the livelihoods of women and youth including advocacy for equality and opportunity access by all people.

== See also ==
- 13th parliament of Kenya
- Amina Laura Mnyazi
- Mary Maingi
