= Kiunga, Kenya =

Division in northern Kenya

Coordinates: 1°45′S 41°30′E

Kiunga is a division in the Lamu District of Coast Province located close to the Indian Ocean coast of northern Kenya, and only 15 kilometres to the border with Somalia. A major marine conservation area, the Kiunga Marine National Reserve has its headquarters at Kiunga. The reserve is an important habitat for mangrove, turtles, and many species of birds. Total population of the division is 3310 (1999 census ). In 2019, desalination plant powered by 50 kW solar panels was installed at Kiunga at a cost of 1/2 million US dollars by the non-profit organization GivePower, producing up to 70 tonnes of clean water per day.

== See also ==
- Historic Swahili Settlements
- Swahili architecture
